

25001–25100 

|-
| 25001 Pacheco ||  || Rafael Pacheco (born 1954), a Spanish amateur astronomer, astrometrist and co-discoverer of minor planets || 
|-id=014
| 25014 Christinepalau || 1998 QT || Christine Palau (born 1964), a computer specialist who worked on an artificial-intelligence industrial project. || 
|-id=015
| 25015 Lairdclose ||  || Laird M. Close (born 1967), Professor of Astronomy at the University of Arizona, is an expert in adaptive optics, particularly as applied to the study of brown dwarfs, exoplanets and asteroids. He was a co-discoverer of the satellite of (45) Eugenia, the first asteroid satellite imaged from Earth, as well as (90) Antiope, and others. || 
|-id=018
| 25018 Valbousquet ||  || Franck Valbousquet (born 1959), a French optician and amateur astronomer. || 
|-id=019
| 25019 Walentosky ||  || Matthew James Walentosky, American 2008 Intel International Science and Engineering Fair (ISEF) winner, for his physics and astronomy project. || 
|-id=020
| 25020 Tinyacheng ||  || Tinya Cheng, American 2008 Intel International Science and Engineering Fair (ISEF) winner, for her physics and astronomy team project. || 
|-id=021
| 25021 Nischaykumar ||  || Nischay Kumar, American 2008 Intel International Science and Engineering Fair (ISEF) winner, for his physics and astronomy team project. || 
|-id=022
| 25022 Hemalibatra ||  || Hemali Chandramohan Batra, American 2008 Intel International Science and Engineering Fair (ISEF) winner, for her plant sciences project. || 
|-id=023
| 25023 Sundaresh ||  || Sushant Sundaresh, American 2008 Intel International Science and Engineering Fair (ISEF) winner, for his plant sciences project. || 
|-id=024
| 25024 Calebmcgraw ||  || Caleb John McGraw, American 2008 Intel International Science and Engineering Fair (ISEF) winner, for his plant sciences team project. || 
|-id=025
| 25025 Joshuavo ||  || Joshua Tristan Vo, American 2008 Intel International Science and Engineering Fair (ISEF) winner, for his plant sciences team project. || 
|-id=029
| 25029 Ludwighesse ||  || Ludwig Otto Hesse (1811–1874), German mathematician known for his work in analytic geometry || 
|-id=032
| 25032 Randallray ||  || Randall Scott Ray, American 2008 Intel International Science and Engineering Fair (ISEF) winner, for his plant sciences team project. || 
|-id=034
| 25034 Lesliemarie ||  || Leslie Marie Young, American 2008 Intel International Science and Engineering Fair (ISEF) winner, for her plant sciences team project. || 
|-id=035
| 25035 Scalesse ||  || Carlie Alexandra Scalesse, Canadian 2008 Intel International Science and Engineering Fair (ISEF) winner, for her animal sciences project. || 
|-id=036
| 25036 Elizabethof ||  || Elizabeth Olson Ferreira, Canadian 2008 Intel International Science and Engineering Fair (ISEF) winner, for her animal sciences project. || 
|-id=038
| 25038 Matebezdek ||  || Mate Jozsef Bezdek, Canadian 2008 Intel International Science and Engineering Fair (ISEF) winner, for his mathematical sciences project. || 
|-id=039
| 25039 Chensun ||  || Chen Sun, Canadian 2008 Intel International Science and Engineering Fair (ISEF) winner, for his microbiology project. || 
|-id=042
| 25042 Qiujun ||  || Qiu Jun, Chinese 2008 Intel International Science and Engineering Fair (ISEF) winner, for his electrical and mechanical engineering project. || 
|-id=043
| 25043 Fangxing ||  || Fang Xing, Chinese 2008 Intel International Science and Engineering Fair (ISEF) winner, for his materials and bioengineering project. || 
|-id=045
| 25045 Baixuefei ||  || Bai Xuefei, Chinese 2008 Intel International Science and Engineering Fair (ISEF) winner, for her plant sciences project. || 
|-id=046
| 25046 Suyihan ||  || Su Yi-Han, Chinese (Taiwanese) 2008 Intel International Science and Engineering Fair (ISEF) winner for her chemistry project and the recipient of the Intel Foundation Young Scientist Award. || 
|-id=047
| 25047 Tsuitehsin ||  || Tsui Te Hsin, Chinese (Taiwanese) 2008 Intel International Science and Engineering Fair (ISEF) winner, for her physics and astronomy project. || 
|-id=049
| 25049 Christofnorn ||  || Christoffer Norn, Danish 2008 Intel International Science and Engineering Fair (ISEF) winner, for his energy and transportation project. || 
|-id=050
| 25050 Michmadsen ||  || Michael Kaergaard Madsen, Danish 2008 Intel International Science and Engineering Fair (ISEF) winner, for his environmental sciences team project. || 
|-id=051
| 25051 Vass ||  || Gheorghe Vass (born 1944), an astronomer at the Astronomical Institute of the Romanian Academy. || 
|-id=052
| 25052 Rudawska ||  || Regina Rudawska (born 1979), a postdoctoral fellow at Comenius University in Bratislava. || 
|-id=053
| 25053 Matthewknight ||  || Matthew M. Knight (born 1978), an astronomer at Lowell Observatory in Flagstaff, Arizona. || 
|-id=058
| 25058 Shanegould ||  || Shane Gould (born 1956), Australian olympic swimmer || 
|-id=062
| 25062 Rasmussen ||  || Jesper Lykke Rasmussen, Danish 2008 Intel International Science and Engineering Fair (ISEF) winner, for his environmental sciences team project. || 
|-id=065
| 25065 Lautakkin ||  || Lau Tak Kin, Chinese 2008 Intel International Science and Engineering Fair (ISEF) winner, for his electrical and mechanical engineering team project. || 
|-id=073
| 25073 Lautakshing ||  || Lau Tak Shing, Chinese 2008 Intel International Science and Engineering Fair (ISEF) winner, for his electrical and mechanical engineering team project. || 
|-id=074
| 25074 Honami ||  || Sakaguchi Honami, Japanese 2008 Intel International Science and Engineering Fair (ISEF) winner, for her animal sciences project. || 
|-id=075
| 25075 Kiyomoto ||  || Kiyomoto Daisuke, Japanese 2008 Intel International Science and Engineering Fair (ISEF) winner, for his energy and transportation team project. || 
|-id=082
| 25082 Williamhodge ||  || William Hodge (1903–1975) studied at Edinburgh and Cambridge and in 1936 was elected to the Lowndean chair of astronomy and geometry at Cambridge. His mathematical work was in algebraic geometry, specifically the theory of harmonic integrals and their applications to analysis. || 
|-id=084
| 25084 Jutzi ||  || Martin Jutzi (born 1979), a researcher at the University of Bern. || 
|-id=085
| 25085 Melena ||  || Robin Melena (born 1959) is secretary-treasurer of Lowell Observatory. She manages all the observatory's business functions, including accounting, auditing and human resources || 
|-id=087
| 25087 Kaztaniguchi ||  || Taniguchi Kazushige, Japanese 2008 Intel International Science and Engineering Fair (ISEF) winner, for his energy and transportation team project. || 
|-id=088
| 25088 Yoshimura ||  || Yoshimura Fumiya, Japanese 2008 Intel International Science and Engineering Fair (ISEF) winner, for his energy and transportation team project. || 
|-id=089
| 25089 Sanabria-Rivera ||  || Betsaira Sanabria-Rivera, American (Puerto Rican) 2008 Intel International Science and Engineering Fair (ISEF) winner, for her biochemistry team project. || 
|-id=091
| 25091 Sanchez-Claudio ||  || Alex Antonio Sanchez-Claudio, American (Puerto Rican) 2008 Intel International Science and Engineering Fair (ISEF) winner, for his biochemistry team project. || 
|-id=093
| 25093 Andmikhaylov ||  || Andrey A. Mikhaylov, Russian 2008 Intel International Science and Engineering Fair (ISEF) winner, for his chemistry team project. || 
|-id=094
| 25094 Zemtsov ||  || Artem A. Zemtsov, Russian 2008 Intel International Science and Engineering Fair (ISEF) winner, for his chemistry team project. || 
|-id=095
| 25095 Churinov ||  || Andrey Anatolievich Churinov, Russian 2008 Intel International Science and Engineering Fair (ISEF) winner, for his computer science team project. || 
|-id=098
| 25098 Gridnev ||  || Maxim Gennadievich Gridnev, Russian 2008 Intel International Science and Engineering Fair (ISEF) winner, for his computer science team project. || 
|-id=099
| 25099 Mashinskiy ||  || Leonid Andreevich Mashinskiy, Russian 2008 Intel International Science and Engineering Fair (ISEF) winner, for his computer science team project. || 
|-id=100
| 25100 Zhaiweichao ||  || Zhai Weichao, Singaporean 2008 Intel International Science and Engineering Fair (ISEF) winner, for her materials and bioengineering team project. || 
|}

25101–25200 

|-id=102
| 25102 Zhaoye ||  || Zhao Ye, Singaporean 2008 Intel International Science and Engineering Fair (ISEF) winner, for her materials and bioengineering team project. || 
|-id=103
| 25103 Kimdongyoung ||  || Kim Dongyoung, South-Korean 2008 Intel International Science and Engineering Fair (ISEF) winner for his computer science project and recipient of a Seaborg Stockholm International Youth Science Seminar (SIYSS) award || 
|-id=104
| 25104 Chohyunghoon ||  || Cho Hyunghoon, South-Korean 2008 Intel International Science and Engineering Fair (ISEF) winner, for his microbiology team project. || 
|-id=105
| 25105 Kimnayeon ||  || Kim Na Yeon, South-Korean 2008 Intel International Science and Engineering Fair (ISEF) winner, for her microbiology team project. || 
|-id=106
| 25106 Ryoojungmin ||  || Ryoo Jung Min, South-Korean 2008 Intel International Science and Engineering Fair (ISEF) winner, for her microbiology team project. || 
|-id=108
| 25108 Boström ||  || Johan Ingemar Boström, Swedish 2008 Intel International Science and Engineering Fair (ISEF) winner, for his animal sciences team project. || 
|-id=109
| 25109 Hofving ||  || Tobias Olof Hofving, Swedish 2008 Intel International Science and Engineering Fair (ISEF) winner, for his animal sciences team project. || 
|-id=111
| 25111 Klokun ||  || Vitaliy Mykhaylovych Klokun, Ukrainian 2008 Intel International Science and Engineering Fair (ISEF) winner, for his chemistry team project. || 
|-id=112
| 25112 Mymeshkovych ||  || Maryna Yuriivna Meshkovych, Ukrainian 2008 Intel International Science and Engineering Fair (ISEF) winner, for her chemistry team project. || 
|-id=113
| 25113 Benwasserman ||  || Benjamin David Wasserman, American 2008 Intel International Science and Engineering Fair (ISEF) winner, for his behavioral and social sciences project. || 
|-id=115
| 25115 Drago ||  || Claire Elizabeth Drago, American 2008 Intel International Science and Engineering Fair (ISEF) winner, for her behavioral and social sciences team project. || 
|-id=116
| 25116 Jonathanwang ||  || Jonathan Wang, American 2008 Intel International Science and Engineering Fair (ISEF) winner for his medicine and health sciences team project and recipient of the European Union Contest for Young Scientists (EUCYS) Award || 
|-id=118
| 25118 Kevlin ||  || Kevin Huang Lin, American 2008 Intel International Science and Engineering Fair (ISEF) winner, for his microbiology project. || 
|-id=119
| 25119 Kakani ||  || Pragya Kakani, American 2008 Intel International Science and Engineering Fair (ISEF) winner, for her physics and astronomy team project. || 
|-id=120
| 25120 Yvetteleung ||  || Yvette Leung, American 2008 Intel International Science and Engineering Fair (ISEF) winner, for her physics and astronomy team project. || 
|-id=122
| 25122 Kaitlingus ||  || Kaitlyn Jeanne Lingus, American 2008 Intel International Science and Engineering Fair (ISEF) winner, for her plant sciences project. || 
|-id=124
| 25124 Zahramaarouf ||  || Zahra Moein Maarouf, Lebanese 2007 Intel International Science and Engineering Fair (ISEF) winner for her computer science team project. || 
|-id=125
| 25125 Brodallan ||  || Broderick David Allan (born 1995) is a finalist in the 2008 Society for Science and the Public middle school science competition, for his engineering project. He attends the Saginaw Arts and Sciences Academy, Saginaw, Michigan || 
|-id=127
| 25127 Laurentbrunetto || 1998 SZ || Laurent Brunetto (born 1972), a physics professor in Antibes, France. || 
|-id=129
| 25129 Uranoscope ||  || Uranoscope, a French amateur observatory, created in 1983 by Christian Bourdeille (see ) in Gretz Armainvilliers, near Paris. || 
|-id=131
| 25131 Katiemelua ||  || Katie Melua (born 1984), a Georgian-born British singer, songwriter and musician whose songs have included astronomical culture. || 
|-id=133
| 25133 Douglin ||  || Douglas N. C. Lin (born 1949), a theoretical astrophysicist at the University of California, Santa Cruz. || 
|-id=137
| 25137 Seansolomon ||  || Sean Solomon (born 1945), director of the Carnegie Institution of Washington's Department of Terrestrial Magnetism, is a geophysicist and planetary scientist who has studied the Earth's mid-ocean ridges and the surfaces of Venus, Mars and the Moon. He is the Principal Investigator for NASA's MESSENGER mission || 
|-id=138
| 25138 Jaumann ||  || Ralf Jaumann (born 1954), a research scientist at the German Aerospace Center (DLR) and a member of the geology working group for the Dawn mission to Vesta. || 
|-id=139
| 25139 Roatsch ||  || Thomas Roatsch (born 1958), a cartographer of planetary satellite and asteroid surfaces. || 
|-id=140
| 25140 Schmedemann ||  || Nico Schmedemann (born 1978), a researcher at the Institute of Geological Sciences, Freie Universität in Berlin. || 
|-id=142
| 25142 Hopf ||  || Heinz Hopf (1894–1971), a professor of mathematics at ETH Zurich in Switzerland || 
|-id=143
| 25143 Itokawa ||  || Hideo Itokawa (1912–1999), Japanese rocket scientist. He is regarded as the Father of Japanese rocketry. || 
|-id=146
| 25146 Xiada ||  || Established in 1921, Xiamendaxue (Xiamen University, XMU, known by the abbreviation Xiada) is one of the leading universities in China, and has been listed on China's "211 Project", "985 Project", and "Double First-class Initiative", which have been launched by the Chinese government to support selected universities. || 
|-id=151
| 25151 Stefanschröder ||  || Stefan E. Schröder (born 1970), a planetary imaging specialist at the German Aerospace Center (DLR) in Berlin || 
|-id=152
| 25152 Toplis ||  || Michael J. Toplis (born 1969), a geochemist at the University of Toulouse. || 
|-id=153
| 25153 Tomhockey ||  || Thomas Arnold Hockey (born 1959) is a professor of astronomy at the University of Northern Iowa. || 
|-id=154
| 25154 Ayers ||  || Robert Martin Ayers (born 1941) is a long-time supporter of Lowell Observatory, currently serving as secretary of the Executive Committee and a multi-year member of the Advisory Board. He spent the summer at Lowell as an undergraduate in 1961. He retired as principal scientist from Adobe in 2005 || 
|-id=155
| 25155 van Belle ||  || Gerard van Belle (born 1968), an American astronomer at the Lowell Observatory || 
|-id=156
| 25156 Shkolnik ||  || Evgenya Shkolnik (born 1976), a Canadian astronomer at the Lowell Observatory || 
|-id=157
| 25157 Fabian ||  || Andrew Fabian (born 1948), a British astronomer and astrophysicist at the University of Cambridge. He has worked with a number of orbiting X-ray observatories to advance our knowledge of such X-ray sources as black holes, their accretion disks, and gas in active galactic nuclei and clusters of galaxies. || 
|-id=158
| 25158 Berman ||  || Alan Berman (born 1925) is a physicist who played a seminal role in developing modern electronic communications systems. In 15 years as Director of Research at the US Naval Research Laboratory, he oversaw development of the Global Positioning System (GPS) and advanced satellite communications. || 
|-id=159
| 25159 Michaelwest ||  || Michael West (born 1959) is the Deputy Director for Science at Lowell Observatory. His research focuses on star clusters and galaxies. He was PI for six Hubble Space Telescope projects and has authored two books, including A Sky Wonderful with Stars. || 
|-id=160
| 25160 Joellama ||  || Joseph "Joe" Llama (born 1988) is a tenure track astronomer at Lowell Observatory. He started at Lowell as a postdoc working with Evgenia Shkolnik. His research is broadly focused on stars and extrasolar planets. Joe is also an amateur photographer. || 
|-id=161
| 25161 Strosahl ||  || Susan Strosahl (born 1960) has been an employee of Lowell Observatory since 2003. She has a degree in computer engineering. She started working in the public program and is currently working as an observer at Lowell's Navy Precision Optical Interferometer. || 
|-id=162
| 25162 Beckage ||  || Michael (Mike) Beckage (born 1959) is a long-time supporter of Lowell Observatory, currently serving as Chair of Lowell Observatory's Executive Committee and the Lowell Observatory Foundation. He shares his love of astronomy through outreach programs to the community and amateur astronomy clubs || 
|-id=163
| 25163 Williammcdonald ||  || William "Bill" McDonald (born 1935) is an avid amateur astronomer. He has volunteered in Lowell Observatory's evening outreach programs since 2012, spearheading the reintroduction of the public program's video observing system (Mallincam) and assisting staff with its upgrade and maintenance. || 
|-id=164
| 25164 Sonomastate ||  || Sonoma State University, located in Rohnert Park, California, has been educating students in the liberal arts and sciences since 1961. It has a nationally recognized Education and Public Outreach program for space missions and STEM teacher education, and its physics students have built a successful CubeSat. || 
|-id=165
| 25165 Leget ||  || Robert Leget (born 1935) is an American educator who taught high school earth science, chemistry and math for 30 years, mostly at Buckeye High in Medina, Ohio. Named Outstanding Secondary Earth Science Teacher for Ohio by the National Assoc. of Geology Teachers, he inspired generations of students. || 
|-id=166
| 25166 Thompson ||  || Samantha Thompson (born 1985) is the curator of exhibits at Lowell Observatory in Flagstaff, AZ. She has degrees in history and in physics & astronomy. In 2016 she designed Lowell's Spaceguard Academy exhibit that highlighted the science and exploration of asteroids || 
|-id=175
| 25175 Lukeandraka ||  || Luke Steven Andraka (born 1995) is a finalist in the 2008 Society for Science and the Public middle school science competition, for his environmental sciences project. He attends the Chesapeake Science Point Public Charter School, Hanover, Maryland || 
|-id=176
| 25176 Thomasaunins ||  || Thomas Rudolf Aunins (born 1994) is a finalist in the 2008 Society for Science and the Public middle school science competition, for his physical sciences project. He attends the Lenape Middle School, Doylestown, Pennsylvania || 
|-id=178
| 25178 Shreebose ||  || Shree Bose (born 1994) is a finalist in the 2008 Society for Science and the Public middle school science competition, for her environmental sciences project. She attends the Trinity Valley School, Fort Worth, Texas || 
|-id=180
| 25180 Kenyonconlin ||  || Kenyon Rex Conlin (born 1996) is a finalist in the 2008 Society for Science and the Public middle school science competition, for his physical sciences project. He attends the Rocky Mountain Middle School, Heber City, Utah || 
|-id=182
| 25182 Siddhawan ||  || Sidharth Dhawan (born 1994) is a finalist in the 2008 Society for Science and the Public middle school science competition, for his engineering project. He attends the Meadow Park Middle School, Beaverton, Oregon || 
|-id=183
| 25183 Grantfisher ||  || Grant Garrett Fisher (born 1994) is a finalist in the 2008 Society for Science and the Public middle school science competition, for his animal and plant sciences project. He attends the Pi Beta Phi Elementary School, Gatlinburg, Tennessee || 
|-id=184
| 25184 Taylorgaines ||  || Taylor Diahann Gaines (born 1995) is a finalist in the 2008 Society for Science and the Public middle school science competition, for her animal and plant sciences project. She attends the Iva E. Wells Middle School, Seneca, Missouri || 
|-id=189
| 25189 Glockner ||  || Katherine Whittemore Glockner (born 1994) is a finalist in the 2008 Society for Science and the Public middle school science competition, for her biochemistry, medicine, health science and microbiology project. She attends the Rhoades School, Encinitas, California || 
|-id=190
| 25190 Thomasgoodin ||  || Thomas J. T. Goodin (born 1994) is a finalist in the 2008 Society for Science and the Public middle school science competition, for his engineering project. He attends the Mid-Pacific Institute, Honolulu, Hawaii || 
|-id=191
| 25191 Rachelouise ||  || Rachel Louise Graham (born 1995) is a finalist in the 2008 Society for Science and the Public middle school science competition, for her engineering project. She attends the Riverton Middle School, Riverton, Wyoming || 
|-id=193
| 25193 Taliagreene ||  || Talia Kate Greene (born 1994) is a finalist in the 2008 Society for Science and the Public middle school science competition, for her mathematics and computer science project. She attends the Cocoa Beach Junior Senior High School, Cocoa Beach, Florida || 
|-id=198
| 25198 Kylienicole ||  || Kylie Nicole Grissom (born 1993) is a finalist in the 2008 Society for Science and the Public middle school science competition, for her earth and space sciences project. She attends the North Ogden Junior High School, North Ogden, Utah || 
|-id=199
| 25199 Jiahegu ||  || Jiahe Gu (born 1994) is a finalist in the 2008 Society for Science and the Public middle school science competition, for his animal and plant sciences project. He attends the Martin Luther King Jr., Magnet High School, Nashville, Tennessee || 
|}

25201–25300 

|-id=212
| 25212 Ayushgupta ||  || Ayush Gupta (born 1993) is a finalist in the 2008 Society for Science and the Public middle school science competition, for his physical sciences project. He attends the Oregon Episcopal School, Portland, Oregon || 
|-id=216
| 25216 Enricobernardi ||  || Enrico Bernardi (1841–1919), an Italian engineer and professor of mechanics. || 
|-id=225
| 25225 Patrickbenson ||  || Patrick "Pat" Benson (born 1951) has volunteered in Lowell Observatory's evening outreach programs since 2012 as a portable telescope operator. He also participates in community astronomy outreach activities. His decades of experience in amateur astronomy make him a highly valued member of the volunteer team. || 
|-id=226
| 25226 Brasch ||  || Klaus Brasch (born 1940) began volunteering at Lowell Observatory in 2008 as a portable telescope operator in our evening outreach programs. He is also an astrophotographer and writer; many of his images as well as Lowell-related articles have been published in Sky & Telescope and Astronomy magazines, among others. || 
|-id=227
| 25227 Genehill ||  || Gene Hill (born 1933) began volunteering at Lowell Observatory in 2009, and has since shared his passion for teaching and astronomy, giving daytime tours of the Observatory's historic campus and operating our solar telescopes. He always brings in the latest astronomy news to include on his tours. || 
|-id=228
| 25228 Mikekitt ||  || Michael Kitt (born 1941) is an amateur astronomer who has written numerous articles about lunar observing and is author of The Moon: an Observing Guide for Backyard Telescopes. He is a long-standing Lowell Observatory Advisory Board member and a supporter of preservation activities there. || 
|-id=229
| 25229 Karenkitt ||  || Karen Kitt (born 1949) has been a volunteer in the Lowell Observatory Archives since 2013. She has organized and cataloged the Pluto Collection, the Comet Halley Collection, and the correspondence of former Lowell astronomer C.O. Lampland. She is currently digitizing Lampland's letters for the observatory's digital archives. || 
|-id=230
| 25230 Borgis ||  || Steven Borgis (born 1953) is an American educator and coach, who taught language arts for three decades at Buckeye Junior High School in Medina, Ohio. He coached both girls and boys basketball, as well as football, cross country, golf, volleyball, and softball, and inspired students with both his words and his actions. || 
|-id=231
| 25231 Naylor ||  || Kris Naylor (born 1966) has been utilizing her amateur astronomy skills since 2005 as a Lowell Observatory volunteer, operating portable telescopes during our evening outreach programs. Kris has helped to mentor new volunteers, and been involved in astronomy outreach activities throughout the Flagstaff community. || 
|-id=232
| 25232 Schatz ||  || Dennis Schatz (born 1947) is an American astronomer and educator who was Vice-President of the Pacific Science Center, President & workshop leader for the Astronomical Society of the Pacific, author of 23 children's books on science, and co-developer of educational programs like Project ASTRO & Portal to the Public. || 
|-id=233
| 25233 Tallman ||  || Gary Tallman (born 1943) has volunteered in Lowell Observatory's daytime outreach programs since 2012, leading tours of the historic campus and hosting Putnam Collection Center open houses. He also operates the solar telescopes, explaining visible features of the Sun to visitors. || 
|-id=234
| 25234 Odell ||  || Andy Odell (born 1949) is a professional astronomer. He's been involved with Lowell's evening outreach programs since 2002, operating portable telescopes and sharing his knowledge of the night sky with visitors. He is Lowell's longest-tenured volunteer. || 
|-id=237
| 25237 Hurwitz ||  || Adolf Hurwitz (1859–1919), German mathematician || 
|-id=240
| 25240 Qiansanqiang ||  || Sanqiang Qiang (1913–1992), a Chinese nuclear scientist and member of the Chinese Academy of Sciences, and one of the founders of China's atomic energy program || 
|-id=250
| 25250 Jonnapeterson ||  || Jonna Peterson (born 1945) has been familiar with the night sky since childhood, and a dedicated volunteer in Lowell Observatory's evening outreach programs since 2012. She enjoys using binoculars to teach visitors about the night sky. || 
|-id=256
| 25256 Imbrie-Moore ||  || Annabel Imbrie-Moore (born 1994) is a finalist in the 2008 Society for Science and the Public middle school science competition, for her mathematics & computer science project. She attends the Peabody School, Charlottesville, Virginia || 
|-id=257
| 25257 Elizmakarron ||  || Elizabeth Marie Karron (born 1996) is a finalist in the 2008 Society for Science and the Public middle school science competition, for her animal and plant sciences project. She attends the Whitefish Bay Middle School, Whitefish Bay, Wisconsin || 
|-id=258
| 25258 Nathaniel || 1998 VU || Nathaniel Brian Marsden (born 1997), second grandson of Minor Planet Center director Brian G. Marsden (the asteroid was discovered on his first birthday) || 
|-id=259
| 25259 Lucarnold ||  || Luc Arnold (born 1965) is an astronomer working at the Observatoire de Haute Provence. His research fields are exobiology and optics, but he observes comets with his homemade telescope || 
|-id=264
| 25264 Erickeen ||  || Eric C. Keen (born 1994) is a finalist in the 2008 Society for Science and the Public middle school science competition, for his environmental sciences project. He is homeschooled in Bethesda, Maryland || 
|-id=266
| 25266 Taylorkinyon ||  || Taylor Frances Kinyon (born 1994) is a finalist in the 2008 Society for Science and the Public middle school science competition, for her engineering project. She attends the Plankinton School District, Plankinton, South Dakota || 
|-id=273
| 25273 Barrycarole ||  || Barry Paul Keith Griffin (born 1943) and Carole Anne Griffin (born 1944), the parents of British astronomer Ian P. Griffin who discovered this minor planet || 
|-id=275
| 25275 Jocelynbell ||  || Jocelyn Bell Burnell (born 1943), British astrophysicist from Northern Ireland, who co-discovered the first radio pulsar in 1967 || 
|-id=276
| 25276 Dimai ||  || Alessandro Dimai (born 1962), Italian amateur astronomer and discoverer of supernovae. He is an active observer at the Cortina Observatory  and a friend of the discoverer. || 
|-id=290
| 25290 Vibhuti ||  || Vibhuti Krishna (born 1994) is a finalist in the 2008 Society for Science and the Public middle school science competition, for her biochemistry, medicine, health science and microbiology project. She attends the Solon Middle School, Solon, Ohio || 
|-id=294
| 25294 Johnlaberee ||  || John Alfred Laberee (born 1994) is a finalist in the 2008 Society for Science and the Public middle school science competition, for his environmental sciences project. He is homeschooled in Medford, New Jersey || 
|-id=298
| 25298 Fionapaine ||  || Fiona Ann Paine (born 1995) is a finalist in the 2008 Society for Science and the Public middle school science competition, for her environmental sciences project. She attends the Barrington Middle School, Barrington, Rhode Island || 
|-id=300
| 25300 Andyromine ||  || Andrew Romine, 2008 SSP/MSP national science fair finalist || 
|}

25301–25400 

|-
| 25301 Ambrofogar ||  || Ambrogio Fogar, Italian sailor (yachtsman), explorer and author ‡ || 
|-id=302
| 25302 Niim ||  || Yoshihiro Niim, Japanese space engineer || 
|-id=309
| 25309 Chrisauer ||  || Christopher Peterson Sauer (born 1995) is a finalist in the 2008 Society for Science and the Public middle school science competition, for his engineering project. He attends the Corte Madera School, Portola Valley, California || 
|-id=312
| 25312 Asiapossenti ||  || Asia Possenti (born 2008) is a nephew of the discoverer || 
|-id=316
| 25316 Comnick ||  || Richard "Rich" Comnick (born 1940) has been a volunteer in the Lowell Observatory archives since 2007. He has digitized and catalogued historic observation logbooks, photographs and manuscript material for the Archives website and the Arizona Memory Project. || 
|-id=321
| 25321 Rohitsingh ||  || Rohit Kumar Singh (born 1994) is a finalist in the 2008 Society for Science and the Public middle school science competition, for his engineering project. He attends the Lincoln Middle School, Gainesville, Florida || 
|-id=322
| 25322 Rebeccajean ||  || Rebecca Jean Smouse (born 1995) is a finalist in the 2008 Society for Science and the Public middle school science competition, for her animal and plant sciences project. She attends the Kyrene Middle School, Tempe, Arizona || 
|-id=326
| 25326 Lawrencesun ||  || Lawrence Sun (born 1996) is a finalist in the 2008 Society for Science and the Public middle school science competition, for his mathematics and computer science project. He attends the Highland Park Middle School, Beaverton, Oregon || 
|-id=331
| 25331 Berrevoets ||  || Cor Berrevoets, Dutch developer of Registax, astronomical image-processing freeware || 
|-id=333
| 25333 Britwenger ||  || Brittany Michelle Wenger (born 1994) is a finalist in the 2008 Society for Science and the Public middle school science competition, for her mathematics and computer science project. She attends the R. Dan Nolan Middle School, Bradenton, Florida || 
|-id=340
| 25340 Segoves ||  || Segovesus, Central European Celtic prince †  || 
|-id=348
| 25348 Wisniowiecki ||  || Anna Marie Wisniowiecki (born 1993) is a finalist in the 2008 Society for Science and the Public middle school science competition, for her earth and space sciences project. She attends the McCullough Junior High School, The Woodlands, Texas || 
|-id=354
| 25354 Zdasiuk ||  || Jonathan Andrew Zdasiuk (born 1995) is a finalist in the 2008 Society for Science and the Public middle school science competition, for his engineering project. He attends the Corte Madera School, Portola Valley, California || 
|-id=358
| 25358 Boskovice ||  || Boskovice a town in Middle Moravia, was settled in prehistoric times. A gothic castle from the 13th century and a Jewish quarter are among its many tourist attractions || 
|-id=364
| 25364 Allisonbaas ||  || Allison Baas mentored a finalist in the 2008 Society for Science and the Public middle school science competition. She teaches at the Plankinton School District, Plankinton, South Dakota || 
|-id=365
| 25365 Bernreuter ||  || John Bernreuter mentored a finalist in the 2008 Society for Science and the Public middle school science competition. She teaches at the R. Dan Nolan Middle School, Bradenton, Florida || 
|-id=366
| 25366 Maureenbobo ||  || Maureen Bobo mentored a finalist in the 2008 Society for Science and the Public middle school science competition. She teaches at the Rocky Mountain Middle School, Heber City, Utah || 
|-id=367
| 25367 Cicek ||  || Kazim Cicek mentored a finalist in the 2008 Society for Science and the Public middle school science competition. He teaches at the Chesapeake Science Point Public Charter School, Hanover, Maryland || 
|-id=368
| 25368 Gailcolwell ||  || Gail Colwell mentored a finalist in the 2008 Society for Science and the Public middle school science competition. She teaches at the McCullough Junior High School, The Woodlands, Texas || 
|-id=369
| 25369 Dawndonovan ||  || Dawn Donovan mentored a finalist in the 2008 Society for Science and the Public middle school science competition. She teaches at the Martin Luther King Jr., Magnet High School, Nashville, Tennessee || 
|-id=370
| 25370 Karenfletch ||  || Karen Fletcher mentored a finalist in the 2008 Society for Science and the Public middle school science competition. She teaches at the Barrington Middle School, Barrington, Rhode Island || 
|-id=371
| 25371 Frangaley ||  || Fran Galey mentored a finalist in the 2008 Society for Science and the Public middle school science competition. She teaches at the Riverton Middle School, Riverton, Wyoming || 
|-id=372
| 25372 Shanagarza ||  || Shana Garza mentored a finalist in the 2008 Society for Science and the Public middle school science competition. She teaches at the Pi Beta Phi Elementary School, Gatlinburg, Tennessee || 
|-id=373
| 25373 Gorsch ||  || Lisa Gorsch mentored a finalist in the 2008 Society for Science and the Public middle school science competition. She teaches at the Peabody School, Charlottesville, Virginia || 
|-id=374
| 25374 Harbrucker ||  || Roberta Harbrucker mentored a finalist in the 2008 Society for Science and the Public middle school science competition. She teaches at the Lincoln Middle School, Gainesville, Florida || 
|-id=375
| 25375 Treenajoi ||  || Treena Joi mentored a finalist in the 2008 Society for Science and the Public middle school science competition. She teaches at the Corte Madera School, Portola Valley, California || 
|-id=376
| 25376 Christikeen ||  || Christine Keen mentored a finalist in the 2008 Society for Science and the Public middle school science competition. She teaches at a homeschool, Bethesda, Maryland || 
|-id=377
| 25377 Rolaberee ||  || Rosemary Laberee mentored a finalist in the 2008 Society for Science and the Public middle school science competition. She teaches at a homeschool, Medford, New Jersey || 
|-id=378
| 25378 Erinlambert ||  || Erin Lambert mentored a finalist in the 2008 Society for Science and the Public middle school science competition. She teaches at the Kyrene Middle School, Tempe, Arizona || 
|-id=381
| 25381 Jerrynelson ||  || Jerry Nelson mentored a finalist in the 2008 Society for Science and the Public middle school science competition. He teaches at the North Ogden Junior High School, North Ogden, Utah || 
|-id=383
| 25383 Lindacker ||  || Jan Tadeáš Lindacker (1768–1816) was a Czech geologist and botanist. He worked in Osek, near Rokycany, in iron ore mines, where he assembled a unique collection of Carboniferous fossil plants and minerals and joined it with that of Kaspar Maria von Sternberg. The collection was donated to the National Museum in Prague. || 
|-id=384
| 25384 Partizánske ||  || Partizánske, western Slovakia (originally Symoni), home to a public observatory || 
|-id=399
| 25399 Vonnegut ||  || Kurt Vonnegut (born 1922), a revolutionary U.S. science-fiction writer who crossed over into mainstream literature and is often referred to as the "Mark Twain of the second half of the twentieth century". || 
|}

25401–25500 

|-id=402
| 25402 Angelanorse ||  || Angela Norse mentored a finalist in the 2008 Society for Science and the Public middle school science competition. She teaches at the Highland Park Middle School, Beaverton, Oregon || 
|-id=403
| 25403 Carlapiazza ||  || Carla Piazza mentored a finalist in the 2008 Society for Science and the Public middle school science competition. She teaches at the Saginaw Arts and Sciences Academy, Saginaw, Michigan || 
|-id=404
| 25404 Shansample ||  || Shannon Sample mentored a finalist in the 2008 Society for Science and the Public middle school science competition. She teaches at the Iva E. Wells Middle School, Seneca, Missouri || 
|-id=405
| 25405 Jeffwidder ||  || Jeff Widder mentored a finalist in the 2008 Society for Science and the Public middle school science competition. He teaches at the Whitefish Bay Middle School, Whitefish Bay, Wisconsin || 
|-id=406
| 25406 Debwysocki ||  || Deborah Wysocki mentored a finalist in the 2008 Society for Science and the Public middle school science competition. She teaches at the Lenape Middle School, Doylestown, Pennsylvania || 
|-id=410
| 25410 Abejar ||  || Patrick Jeffrey Abejar (born 1991) is a finalist in the 2009 Intel Science Talent Search (STS), a science competition for high school seniors, for his earth and planetary science project. He attends the Smithtown High School West, Smithtown, New York || 
|-id=412
| 25412 Arbesfeld ||  || Noah Maxwell Arbesfeld (born 1991) is a finalist in the 2009 Intel Science Talent Search (STS), a science competition for high school seniors, for his mathematics project. He attends the Lexington High School, Lexington, Massachusetts || 
|-id=413
| 25413 Dorischen ||  || Doris Chen (born 1991) is a finalist in the 2009 Intel Science Talent Search (STS), a science competition for high school seniors, for her medicine and health project. She attends the Tenafly High School, Tenafly, New Jersey || 
|-id=414
| 25414 Cherkassky ||  || Michael Sheng Cherkassky (born 1991) is a finalist in the 2009 Intel Science Talent Search (STS), a science competition for high school seniors, for his computer science project. He attends the Edina High School, Edina, Minnesota || 
|-id=415
| 25415 Jocelyn ||  || Jocelyn Chuang (born 1991) is a finalist in the 2009 Intel Science Talent Search (STS), a science competition for high school seniors, for her behavioral and social sciences project. She attends the Bronx High School of Science, Bronx, New York || 
|-id=416
| 25416 Chyanwen ||  || Wen Chyan (born 1991) is a finalist in the 2009 Intel Science Talent Search (STS), a science competition for high school seniors, for his chemistry project. He attends the Texas Academy of Mathematics & Science, Denton, Texas || 
|-id=417
| 25417 Coquillette ||  || Elizabeth Charlotte Coquillette (born 1991) is a finalist in the 2009 Intel Science Talent Search (STS), a science competition for high school seniors, for her engineering project. She attends the Hathaway Brown School, Shaker Heights, Ohio || 
|-id=418
| 25418 Deshmukh ||  || Aniruddha Sandeep Deshmukh (born 1991) is a finalist in the 2009 Intel Science Talent Search (STS), a science competition for high school seniors, for his botany project. He attends the Bellarmine College Preparatory School, San Jose, California || 
|-id=421
| 25421 Gafaran ||  || Gabriela Aylin Faran (born 1990) is a finalist in the 2009 Intel Science Talent Search (STS), a science competition for high school seniors, for her earth and planetary science project. She attends the West High School, Madison, Wisconsin || 
|-id=422
| 25422 Abigreene ||  || Abigail Sara Greene (born 1991) is a finalist in the 2009 Intel Science Talent Search (STS), a science competition for high school seniors, for her behavioral and social sciences project. She attends the John Jay High School, Cross River, New York || 
|-id=424
| 25424 Gunasekaran ||  || Suvai Gunasekaran (born 1991) is a finalist in the 2009 Intel Science Talent Search (STS), a science competition for high school seniors, for her materials science project. She attends the James Madison Memorial High School, Madison, Wisconsin || 
|-id=425
| 25425 Chelsealynn ||  || Chelsea Lynn Jurman (born 1991) is a finalist in the 2009 Intel Science Talent Search (STS), a science competition for high school seniors, for her behavioral and social sciences project. She attends the Roslyn High School, Roslyn Heights, New York || 
|-id=426
| 25426 Alexanderkim ||  || Alexander Mee-Woong Kim (born 1991) is a finalist in the 2009 Intel Science Talent Search (STS), a science competition for high school seniors, for his zoology project. He attends the Thomas Jefferson High School for Science nce and Technology, Alexandria, Virginia || 
|-id=427
| 25427 Kratchmarov ||  || Radomir Kratchmarov (born 1991) is a finalist in the 2009 Intel Science Talent Search (STS), a science competition for high school seniors, for his microbiology project. He attends the Livingston High School, Livingston, New Jersey || 
|-id=428
| 25428 Lakhanpal ||  || Nitish Lakhanpal (born 1991) is a finalist in the 2009 Intel Science Talent Search (STS), a science competition for high school seniors, for his bioinformatics and genomics project. He attends the University High School, Irvine, California || 
|-id=430
| 25430 Ericlarson ||  || Eric Kerner Larson (born 1991) is a finalist in the 2009 Intel Science Talent Search (STS), a science competition for high school seniors, for his mathematics project. He attends the South Eugene High School, Eugene, Oregon || 
|-id=432
| 25432 Josepherli ||  || Josepher Li (born 1991) is a finalist in the 2009 Intel Science Talent Search (STS), a science competition for high school seniors, for his biochemistry project. He attends the Bronx High School of Science, Bronx, New York || 
|-id=434
| 25434 Westonia ||  || Elizabeth Jane Weston (1581–1612), known as "Westonia", was an English-Czech poet, known mostly for her Neo-Latin poetry. Her Parthenicon was published in 1608. She is considered the first female Czech poet. || 
|-id=455
| 25455 Anissamak ||  || Anissa Yuenming Mak (born 1991) is a finalist in the 2009 Intel Science Talent Search (STS), a science competition for high school seniors, for her mathematics project. She attends the Stuyvesant High School, New York, New York || 
|-id=456
| 25456 Caitlinmann ||  || Caitlin Maureen Mann (born 1991) is a finalist in the 2009 Intel Science Talent Search (STS), a science competition for high school seniors, for her engineering project. She attends the Hathaway Brown School, Shaker Heights, Ohio || 
|-id=457
| 25457 Mariannamao ||  || Marianna Yuling Mao (born 1991) is a finalist in the 2009 Intel Science Talent Search (STS), a science competition for high school seniors, for her physics project. She attends the Mission San Jose High School, Fremont, California || 
|-id=462
| 25462 Haydenmetsky ||  || Hayden Craig Metsky (born 1991) is a finalist in the 2009 Intel Science Talent Search (STS), a science competition for high school seniors, for his computer science project. He attends the Millburn High School, Millburn, New Jersey || 
|-id=464
| 25464 Maxrabinovich ||  || Maxim Rabinovich (born 1991) is a finalist in the 2009 Intel Science Talent Search (STS), a science competition for high school seniors, for his mathematics project. He attends the Shorecrest Preparatory School, St. Petersburg, Florida || 
|-id=465
| 25465 Rajagopalan ||  || Aditya Rajagopalan (born 1991) is a finalist in the 2009 Intel Science Talent Search (STS), a science competition for high school seniors, for his biochemistry project. He attends the Choate Rosemary Hall, Wallingford, Connecticut || 
|-id=468
| 25468 Ramakrishna ||  || Smitha Ramakrishna (born 1991) is a finalist in the 2009 Intel Science Talent Search (STS), a science competition for high school seniors, for her environmental science project. She attends the Corona del Sol High School, Tempe, Arizona || 
|-id=469
| 25469 Ransohoff ||  || Julia Dory Ransohoff (born 1991) is a finalist in the 2009 Intel Science Talent Search (STS), a science competition for high school seniors, for her medicine and health project. She attends the Menlo-Atherton High School, Atherton, California || 
|-id=472
| 25472 Joanoro ||  || Joan Oro, Spanish (Catalan)-American biologist and public science advocate || 
|-id=475
| 25475 Lizrao ||  || Elizabeth Jie Rao (born 1991) is a finalist in the 2009 Intel Science Talent Search (STS), a science competition for high school seniors, for her medicine and health project. She attends the Lincoln Park High School, Chicago, Illinois || 
|-id=476
| 25476 Sealfon ||  || Adam Benjamin Sealfon (born 1991) is a finalist in the 2009 Intel Science Talent Search (STS), a science competition for high school seniors, for his computer science project. He attends the Stuyvesant High School, New York, New York || 
|-id=477
| 25477 Preyashah ||  || Preya Shah (born 1991) is a finalist in the 2009 Intel Science Talent Search (STS), a science competition for high school seniors, for her chemistry project. She attends the Ward Melville High School, East Setauket, New York || 
|-id=478
| 25478 Shrock ||  || Christine Lee Shrock (born 1991) is a finalist in the 2009 Intel Science Talent Search (STS), a science competition for high school seniors, for her bioinformatics and genomics project. She attends the Ward Melville High School, East Setauket, New York || 
|-id=479
| 25479 Ericshyu ||  || Eric Shyu (born 1991) is a finalist in the 2009 Intel Science Talent Search (STS), a science competition for high school seniors, for his chemistry project. He attends the Illinois Mathematics & Science Academy, Aurora, Illinois || 
|-id=481
| 25481 Willjaysun ||  || William Jayang Sun (born 1991) is a finalist in the 2009 Intel Science Talent Search (STS), a science competition for high school seniors, for his biochemistry project. He attends the Parkway Central High School, Chesterfield, Missouri || 
|-id=482
| 25482 Tallapragada ||  || Narendra Pundarik Tallapragada (born 1991) is a finalist in the 2009 Intel Science Talent Search (STS), a science competition for high school seniors, for his physics project. He attends the Thomas Jefferson High School for Science and Technology, Alexandria, Virginia || 
|-id=483
| 25483 Trusheim ||  || Stephen Walter Trusheim (born 1990) is a finalist in the 2009 Intel Science Talent Search (STS), a science competition for high school seniors, for his bioinformatics and genomics project. He attends the Breck School, Minneapolis, Minnesota || 
|-id=486
| 25486 Michaelwham ||  || Michael Tyler Wham (born 1990) is a finalist in the 2009 Intel Science Talent Search (STS), a science competition for high school seniors, for his zoology project. He attends the Sterling Ridge Home School, Woodlands, Texas || 
|-id=488
| 25488 Figueiredo ||  || Joanne Figueiredo mentored a finalist in the 2009 Intel Science Talent Search (STS), a science competition for high school seniors. She teaches at the Smithtown High School West, Smithtown, New York || 
|-id=490
| 25490 Kevinkelly ||  || Kevin Kelly mentored a finalist in the 2009 Intel Science Talent Search (STS), a science competition for high school seniors. He teaches at the Lexington High School, Lexington, Massachusetts || 
|-id=491
| 25491 Meador ||  || Granger Meador mentored a finalist in the 2009 Intel Science Talent Search (STS), a science competition for high school seniors. He teaches at the Bartlesville High School, Bartlesville, Oklahoma || 
|-id=492
| 25492 Firnberg ||  || Anat Firnberg mentored a finalist in the 2009 Intel Science Talent Search (STS), a science competition for high school seniors. She teaches at the Tenafly High School, Tenafly, New Jersey || 
|-id=495
| 25495 Michaelroddy ||  || Michael Roddy mentored a finalist in the 2009 Intel Science Talent Search (STS), a science competition for high school seniors. He teaches at the Edina High School, Edina, Minnesota || 
|-id=497
| 25497 Brauerman ||  || Susan Brauerman mentored a finalist in the 2009 Intel Science Talent Search (STS), a science competition for high school seniors. She teaches at the Bronx High School of Science, Bronx, New York || 
|}

25501–25600 

|-id=509
| 25509 Rodwong ||  || Rod Wong mentored a finalist in the 2009 Intel Science Talent Search (STS), a science competition for high school seniors. He teaches at the Bellarmine College Preparatory School, San Jose, California || 
|-id=510
| 25510 Donvincent ||  || Don Vincent mentored a finalist in the 2009 Intel Science Talent Search (STS), a science competition for high school seniors. He teaches at the West High School, Madison, Wisconsin || 
|-id=511
| 25511 Annlipinsky ||  || Ann Lipinsky mentored a finalist in the 2009 Intel Science Talent Search (STS), a science competition for high school seniors. She teaches at the John Jay High School, Cross River, New York || 
|-id=512
| 25512 Anncomins ||  || Ann Comins mentored a finalist in the 2009 Intel Science Talent Search (STS), a science competition for high school seniors. She teaches at the James Madison Memorial High School, Madison, Wisconsin || 
|-id=513
| 25513 Weseley ||  || Allyson Weseley mentored a finalist in the 2009 Intel Science Talent Search (STS), a science competition for high school seniors. She teaches at the Roslyn High School, Roslyn Heights, New York || 
|-id=514
| 25514 Lisawu ||  || Lisa Wu mentored a finalist in the 2009 Intel Science Talent Search (STS), a science competition for high school seniors. She teaches at the Thomas Jefferson High School for Science and Technology, Alexandria, Virginia || 
|-id=515
| 25515 Briancarey ||  || Brian Carey mentored a finalist in the 2009 Intel Science Talent Search (STS), a science competition for high school seniors. He teaches at the Livingston High School, Livingston, New Jersey || 
|-id=516
| 25516 Davidknight ||  || David Knight mentored a finalist in the 2009 Intel Science Talent Search (STS), a science competition for high school seniors. He teaches at the University High School, Irvine, California || 
|-id=517
| 25517 Davidlau ||  || David Lau mentored a finalist in the 2009 Intel Science Talent Search (STS), a science competition for high school seniors. He teaches at the Mission San Jose High School, Fremont, California || 
|-id=518
| 25518 Paulcitrin ||  || Paul Citrin mentored a finalist in the 2009 Intel Science Talent Search (STS), a science competition for high school seniors. He teaches at the Millburn High School, Millburn, New Jersey || 
|-id=519
| 25519 Bartolomeo ||  || Michael Bartolomeo mentored a finalist in the 2009 Intel Science Talent Search (STS), a science competition for high school seniors. He teaches at the Shorecrest Preparatory School, St Petersburg, Florida || 
|-id=520
| 25520 Deronchang ||  || Deron Chang mentored a finalist in the 2009 Intel Science Talent Search (STS), a science competition for high school seniors. He teaches at the Choate Rosemary Hall, Wallingford, Connecticut || 
|-id=521
| 25521 Stevemorgan ||  || Steve Morgan mentored a finalist in the 2009 Intel Science Talent Search (STS), a science competition for high school seniors. He teaches at the Corona del Sol High School, Tempe, Arizona || 
|-id=522
| 25522 Roisen ||  || Patrick Roisen mentored a finalist in the 2009 Intel Science Talent Search (STS), a science competition for high school seniors. He teaches at the Menlo-Atherton High School, Atherton, California || 
|-id=531
| 25531 Lessek ||  || Justin Lessek mentored a finalist in the 2009 Intel Science Talent Search (STS), a science competition for high school seniors. He teaches at the Lincoln Park High School, Chicago, Illinois || 
|-id=538
| 25538 Markcarlson ||  || Mark Carlson mentored a finalist in the 2009 Intel Science Talent Search (STS), a science competition for high school seniors. He teaches at the Illinois Mathematics & Science Academy, Aurora, Illinois || 
|-id=539
| 25539 Roberthelm ||  || Robert Helm mentored a finalist in the 2009 Intel Science Talent Search (STS), a science competition for high school seniors. He teaches at the Methacton High School, Norristown, Pennsylvania || 
|-id=541
| 25541 Greathouse ||  || Kenneth Greathouse mentored a finalist in the 2009 Intel Science Talent Search (STS), a science competition for high school seniors. He teaches at the Parkway Central High School, Chesterfield, Missouri || 
|-id=542
| 25542 Garabedian ||  || Wayne Garabedian mentored a finalist in the 2009 Intel Science Talent Search (STS), a science competition for high school seniors. He teaches at the Clovis West High School, Fresno, California || 
|-id=543
| 25543 Fruen ||  || Lois Fruen mentored a finalist in the 2009 Intel Science Talent Search (STS), a science competition for high school seniors. She teaches at the Breck School, Minneapolis, Minnesota || 
|-id=544
| 25544 Renerogers ||  || Rene Rogers mentored a finalist in the 2009 Intel Science Talent Search (STS), a science competition for high school seniors. She teaches at the Sterling Ridge Home School, Woodlands, Texas || 
|-id=549
| 25549 Jonsauer ||  || Jonothon Sauer mentored a finalist in the 2009 Intel Science Talent Search (STS), a science competition for high school seniors. He teaches at the William Mason High School, Mason, Ohio || 
|-id=551
| 25551 Drewhall ||  || Drew Hall (born 1982), together with Richard Gaster, a fellow student at Stanford University, won the "Change the World" competition, arranged by the IEEE presidents in conjunction with the organization's 125th anniversary in 2009. Their winning project was entitled "Nanolab: A Handheld Diagnostic Laboratory" || 
|-id=552
| 25552 Gaster ||  || Richard Gaster (born 1984), with Drew Hall, won the 2009 Student Humanitarian Supreme Prize of the IEEE "Change the World" competition. Their "Nanolab" project applies engineering and leadership skills to benefit humanity by solving the problem of limited availability of medical laboratories in third-world countries || 
|-id=553
| 25553 Ivanlafer ||  || Ivan Lavander Candido Ferreira (born 1991) was awarded second place in the 2009 Intel International Science and Engineering Fair for his microbiology project. He attends the Colégio Guilherme Dumont Villares, São Paulo, SP, Brasil || 
|-id=554
| 25554 Jayaranjan ||  || Nirusan Jayaranjan (born 1993) was awarded second place in the 2009 Intel International Science and Engineering Fair for his electrical and mechanical engineering project. He attends the College Sturgeon Heights Collegiate, Winnipeg, Manitoba, Canada || 
|-id=555
| 25555 Ratnavarma ||  || Ratna Varma (born 1992) was awarded second place in the 2009 Intel International Science and Engineering Fair for her medicine and health sciences project. She attends the A. B. Lucas Secondary School, London, Ontario, Canada || 
|-id=560
| 25560 Chaihaoxi ||  || Chai Haoxi (born 1991) was awarded second place in the 2009 Intel International Science and Engineering Fair for his plant sciences team project. He attends the No.1 High School Attached to Central China Normal University, Wuhan, Hubei, China || 
|-id=561
| 25561 Leehyunki ||  || Lee Hyun Ki (born 1992) was awarded first place in the 2009 Intel International Science and Engineering Fair for his computer science team project. He attends the Chengdu International School, Chengdu, Sichuan, China || 
|-id=562
| 25562 Limdarren ||  || Lim Darren (born 1993) was awarded first place in the 2009 Intel International Science and Engineering Fair for his computer science team project. He attends the Chengdu International School, Chengdu, Sichuan, China || 
|-id=565
| 25565 Lusiyang ||  || Lu Siyang (born 1991) was awarded second place in the 2009 Intel International Science and Engineering Fair for her plant sciences team project. She attends the No. 1 Middle School Attached To Central China Normal University, Wuhan, Hubei, China || 
|-id=566
| 25566 Panying ||  || Pan Ying (born 1989) was awarded second place in the 2009 Intel International Science and Engineering Fair for her materials and bioengineering project. She attends the Affiliated High School of South China Normal University, Guangzhou, Guangdong, China || 
|-id=570
| 25570 Kesun ||  || Sun Ke (born 1991) was awarded second place in the 2009 Intel International Science and Engineering Fair for her plant sciences team project. She attends the No.1 Middle School Attached To Central China Normal University, Wuhan, Hubei, China || 
|-id=573
| 25573 Wanghaoyu ||  || Wang Haoyu (born 1992) was awarded second place in the 2009 Intel International Science and Engineering Fair for his plant sciences team project. He attends the Beijing 101 Middle School, Beijing, China || 
|-id=577
| 25577 Wangmanqiang ||  || Wang Manqiang (born 1992) was awarded second place in the 2009 Intel International Science and Engineering Fair for his plant sciences team project. He attends the No.80 High School of Beijing, Beijing, China || 
|-id=580
| 25580 Xuelai ||  || Xue Lai (born 1992) was awarded first place in the 2009 Intel International Science and Engineering Fair for his computer science team project. He attends the Chengdu International School, Chengdu, Sichuan, China || 
|-id=584
| 25584 Zhangnelson ||  || Zhang Nelson (born 1993) was awarded second place in the 2009 Intel International Science and Engineering Fair for his computer science project. He attends the Shanghai American School, Shanghai, China || 
|-id=593
| 25593 Camillejordan ||  || Camille Jordan (1838–1921), a French mathematician. || 
|-id=594
| 25594 Kessler ||  || Marvin Kessler, American member of the Northeast Kansas Amateur Astronomer's League || 
|-id=597
| 25597 Glendahill ||  || Glenda Hill (born 1948) has volunteered in the Lowell Observatory Archives since 2010. She has catalogued the correspondence of V.M. Slipher, Percival Lowell and Wrexie Louise Leonard. Glenda has become quite adept at deciphering poor handwriting. She is married to outreach volunteer Gene Hill. || 
|}

25601–25700 

|-
| 25601 Francopacini ||  || Franco Pacini, Italian astrophysicist † || 
|-id=602
| 25602 Ucaronia ||  || Umberto Caronia, father of co-discoverer Alfredo Caronia † || 
|-id=604
| 25604 Karlin ||  || Samuel Karlin, American statistician and mathematician, member of the National Academy of Sciences and recipient of the National Medal of Science || 
|-id=606
| 25606 Chiangshenghao ||  || Chiang Sheng-Hao (born 1991) was awarded second place in the 2009 Intel International Science and Engineering Fair for his mathematical sciences project. He attends the National Experimental High School at Hsinchu Science Park, Hsinchu City, Chinese Taipei || 
|-id=607
| 25607 Tsengiching ||  || Tseng I-Ching (born 1993) was awarded first place and Best in Category in the 2009 Intel International Science and Engineering Fair for her microbiology project. She attends the National Taichung Girl's Senior High School, Taichung, Taiwan, Chinese Taipei || 
|-id=608
| 25608 Hincapie ||  || Melisa Hincapie (born 1991) was awarded second place in the 2009 Intel International Science and Engineering Fair for her energy and transportation project. She attends the Colegio La Compania de Maria La Ensenanza, Medellin, Antioquia, Colombia || 
|-id=609
| 25609 Bogantes ||  || Fabiola Bogantes Jimenez (born 1991) was awarded second place in the 2009 Intel International Science and Engineering Fair for her electrical and mechanical engineering team project. She attends the Colegio Tecnico Profesional de San Sebastian, San Jose, Costa Rica || 
|-id=611
| 25611 Mabellin ||  || Mabellin Fallas Quesada (born 1990) was awarded second place in the 2009 Intel International Science and Engineering Fair for her electrical and mechanical engineering team project. She attends the Colegio Tecnico Profesional de San Sebastian, San Jose, Costa Rica || 
|-id=612
| 25612 Yaoskalucia ||  || Yaoska Lucia Hernandez Duarte (born 1992) was awarded second place in the 2009 Intel International Science and Engineering Fair for her electrical and mechanical engineering team project. She attends the Colegio Tecnico Profesional de San Sebastian, San Jose, Costa Rica || 
|-id=613
| 25613 Bubenicek ||  || Petr Bubeníček (born 1990) was awarded first place in the 2009 Intel International Science and Engineering Fair for his electrical and mechanical engineering team project. He attends the Gymnazium Aloise Jiraska, Litomyšl, Czech Republic || 
|-id=614
| 25614 Jankral ||  || Jan Král (born 1989) was awarded first place in the 2009 Intel International Science and Engineering Fair for his electrical and mechanical engineering team project. He attends the Gymnazium Aloise Jiraska, Litomyšl, Czech Republic || 
|-id=615
| 25615 Votroubek ||  || Marek Votroubek (born 1990) was awarded first place in the 2009 Intel International Science and Engineering Fair for his electrical and mechanical engineering team project. He attends the Gymnazium Aloise Jiraska, Litomyšl, Czech Republic || 
|-id=616
| 25616 Riinuots ||  || Riinu Ots (born 1989) was awarded second place in the 2009 Intel International Science and Engineering Fair for her environmental science project. She attends the Hugo Treffner Gymnasium, Tartu, Estonia || 
|-id=617
| 25617 Thomasnesch ||  || Thomas Nesch (born 1989) was awarded first place in the 2009 Intel International Science and Engineering Fair for his electrical and mechanical engineering project. He attends the Technische Oberschule Stuttgart, Stuttgart, Germany || 
|-id=619
| 25619 Martonspohn ||  || Marton Spohn (born 1989) was awarded second place in the 2009 Intel International Science and Engineering Fair for his cellular and molecular biology project. He attends the Fazekas Mihaly Secondary Grammar School, Budapest, Hungary || 
|-id=620
| 25620 Jayaprakash ||  || Vishnu Jayaprakash (born 1993) was awarded second place in the 2009 Intel International Science and Engineering Fair for his energy and transportation project. He attends the Chettinad Vidyashram, Chennai, Tamil Nadu, India || 
|-id=624
| 25624 Kronecker ||  || Leopold Kronecker, German mathematician. || 
|-id=625
| 25625 Verdenet ||  || Michel Verdenet, French amateur astronomer, chairman of the Association française des observateurs d'étoiles variables (AFOÉV, French Association of Variable Star Observers) † ‡ + || 
|-id=628
| 25628 Kummer ||  || Ernst Eduard Kummer, 19th-century German mathematician || 
|-id=629
| 25629 Mukherjee ||  || Anish Mukherjee (born 1992) was awarded second place in the 2009 Intel International Science and Engineering Fair for his electrical and mechanical engineering team project. He attends the South Point High School, Kolkata, West Bengal, India || 
|-id=630
| 25630 Sarkar ||  || Debarghya Sarkar (born 1991) was awarded second place in the 2009 Intel International Science and Engineering Fair for his electrical and mechanical engineering team project. He attends the South Point High School, Kolkata, West Bengal, India || 
|-id=636
| 25636 Vaishnav ||  || Hetal Kanjibhai Vaishnav (born 1992) was awarded second place in the 2009 Intel International Science and Engineering Fair for her environmental management project. She attends the Late Shree S.G Dholakiya Memorial High School, Rajkot, Gujarat, India || 
|-id=638
| 25638 Ahissar ||  || Shira Ahissar (born 1991) was awarded second place in the 2009 Intel International Science and Engineering Fair for her behavioral and social sciences project. She attends the Aharon Katzir High School, Rehovot, Israel || 
|-id=639
| 25639 Fedina ||  || Ksenia G. Fedina (born 1992) was awarded second place in the 2009 Intel International Science and Engineering Fair for her chemistry project. She attends the Moscow Chemical Lyceum # 1303, Moscow, Russia || 
|-id=640
| 25640 Klintefelt ||  || Philippe Klintefelt Collet (born 1990) was awarded second place in the 2009 Intel International Science and Engineering Fair for his behavioral and social sciences project. He attends the Goteborgs Hogre Samskola, Goteborg, Sweden || 
|-id=642
| 25642 Adiseshan ||  || Tara Anjali Adiseshan (born 1994) was awarded first place in the 2009 Intel International Science and Engineering Fair for her animal sciences project. She also received the Intel Young Scientist Award. She attends the Ramana Academy, Charlottesville, Virginia, U.S.A || 
|-id=645
| 25645 Alexanderyan ||  || Ryan Cherian Alexander (born 1993) was awarded first place and Best in Category in the 2009 Intel International Science and Engineering Fair for his energy and transportation project. He attends the R. C. Clark High School, Plano, Texas, U.S.A || 
|-id=646
| 25646 Noniearora ||  || Shubhangi Arora (born 1993) was awarded first place in the 2009 Intel International Science and Engineering Fair for her microbiology project. She attends the Novi High School, Novi, Michigan, U.S.A || 
|-id=648
| 25648 Baghel ||  || Prateek Singh Baghel (born 1991) was awarded second place in the 2009 Intel International Science and Engineering Fair for his cellular and molecular biology project. He attends the Shaker High School, Latham, New York, U.S.A || 
|-id=650
| 25650 Shaubakshi ||  || Shaunak Krishan Bakshi (born 1993) was awarded first place in the 2009 Intel International Science and Engineering Fair for his behavioral and social sciences team project. He also received the European Union Contest for Young Scientists Award. He attends the Manhasset High School, Manhasset, New York, U.S.A || 
|-id=652
| 25652 Maddieball ||  || Madeleine Amanda Ball (born 1992) was awarded second place in the 2009 Intel International Science and Engineering Fair for her animal sciences project. She attends the Ursuline Academy of Dallas, Dallas, Texas, U.S.A || 
|-id=653
| 25653 Baskaran ||  || Akshai Baskaran (born 1992) was awarded first place in the 2009 Intel International Science and Engineering Fair for his energy and transportation project. He attends the Kennewick High School, Kennewick, Washington, U.S.A || 
|-id=655
| 25655 Baupeter ||  || Peter Bau (born 1992) was awarded second place in the 2009 Intel International Science and Engineering Fair for his animal sciences project. He attends the Chamblee Charter High School, Chamblee, Georgia, U.S.A || 
|-id=656
| 25656 Bejnood ||  || Alborz Bejnood (born 1992) was awarded second place in the 2009 Intel International Science and Engineering Fair for his microbiology team project. He attends the Oak Ridge High School, Oak Ridge, Tennessee, U.S.A || 
|-id=657
| 25657 Berkowitz ||  || Hannah M Berkowitz (born 1993) was awarded first place in the 2009 Intel International Science and Engineering Fair for her environmental management team project. She attends the Long Beach High School, Lido Beach, New York, U.S.A || 
|-id=658
| 25658 Bokor ||  || Jacqueline B Bokor (born 1993) was awarded first place in the 2009 Intel International Science and Engineering Fair for her environmental management team project. She attends the Long Beach High School, Lido Beach, New York, U.S.A || 
|-id=659
| 25659 Liboynton ||  || Li Sallou Boynton (born 1991) was awarded first place in the 2009 Intel International Science and Engineering Fair for her environmental science project. She also received the Intel Young Scientist Award. She attends the Bellaire High School, Bellaire, Texas, U.S.A || 
|-id=662
| 25662 Chonofsky ||  || Mark Adrian Chonofsky (born 1992) was awarded first place and Best in Category in the 2009 Intel International Science and Engineering Fair for his plant sciences project. He attends the Lexington High School, Lexington, Massachusetts, U.S.A || 
|-id=663
| 25663 Nickmycroft ||  || Nicholas Mycroft Christensen (born 1991) is a finalist in the 2010 Intel Science Talent Search (STS) for his physics project. He was also awarded second place in the 2009 Intel International Science and Engineering Fair. He attends the Wetumpka High School, Wetumpka, Alabama, U.S.A || 
|-id=669
| 25669 Kristinrose ||  || Kristin Rose Cordwell (born 1990) was awarded second place in the 2009 Intel International Science and Engineering Fair for her mathematical sciences project. She attends the Manzano High School, Albuquerque, New Mexico, U.S.A || 
|-id=670
| 25670 Densley ||  || Riley Taylor Densley (born 1991) was awarded second place in the 2009 Intel International Science and Engineering Fair for his physics team project. He attends the Bingham High School, South Jordan, Utah, U.S.A || 
|-id=673
| 25673 Di Mascio ||  || Michael Vincent Di Mascio (born 1992) was awarded second place in the 2009 Intel International Science and Engineering Fair for his physics project. He attends the Waynesville High School, Waynesville, Ohio, U.S.A || 
|-id=674
| 25674 Kevinellis ||  || Kevin Michael Ellis (born 1991) was awarded first place and Best in Category in the 2009 Intel International Science and Engineering Fair for his computer science project. He attends the Catlin Gabel School, Beaverton, Oregon, U.S.A || 
|-id=676
| 25676 Jesseellison ||  || Jesse Kane Ellison (born 1991) was awarded second place in the 2009 Intel International Science and Engineering Fair for his electrical and mechanical engineering project. He attends the Bayfield High School, Bayfield, Colorado, U.S.A || 
|-id=677
| 25677 Aaronenten ||  || Aaron Christopher Enten (born 1991) was awarded second place in the 2009 Intel International Science and Engineering Fair for his materials and bioengineering project. He attends the American Heritage School Plantation, Plantation, Florida, U.S.A || 
|-id=678
| 25678 Ericfoss ||  || Eric A. Foss (born 1991) was awarded second place in the 2009 Intel International Science and Engineering Fair for his physics project. He attends the Kentwood High School, Covington, Washington, U.S.A || 
|-id=679
| 25679 Andrewguo ||  || Andrew Yi Guo (born 1991) was awarded second place in the 2009 Intel International Science and Engineering Fair for his medicine and health science s team project. He attends the North Carolina School of Science and Mathematics, Durham, North Carolina, U.S.A || 
|-id=680
| 25680 Walterhansen ||  || Walter Preston Hansen (born 1992) was awarded second place in the 2009 Intel International Science and Engineering Fair for his physics team project. He attends the Bingham High School, South Jordan, Utah, U.S.A || 
|-id=683
| 25683 Haochenhong ||  || Haochen Hong (born 1992) was awarded first place in the 2009 Intel International Science and Engineering Fair for his physics team project. He attends the La Cueva High School, Albuquerque, New Mexico, U.S.A || 
|-id=685
| 25685 Katlinhornig ||  || Katlin Jayne Hornig (born 1991) was awarded first place in the 2009 Intel International Science and Engineering Fair for her behavioral and social sciences project. She attends the Sargent High School, Monte Vista, Colorado, U.S.A || 
|-id=686
| 25686 Stephoskins ||  || Stephanie Page Hoskins (born 1992) was awarded second place in the 2009 Intel International Science and Engineering Fair for her microbiology project. She attends the Lincoln Park Academy, Fort Pierce, Florida, U.S.A || 
|-id=688
| 25688 Hritzo ||  || Bernadette Ann Hritzo (born 1993) was awarded second place in the 2009 Intel International Science and Engineering Fair for her animal sciences project. She attends the Villa Joseph Marie High School, Holland, Pennsylvania, U.S.A || 
|-id=689
| 25689 Duannihuang ||  || Duanni Huang (born 1990) was awarded first place in the 2009 Intel International Science and Engineering Fair for his physics team project. He attends the La Cueva High School, Albuquerque, New Mexico, U.S.A || 
|-id=690
| 25690 Iredale ||  || Marley Elizabeth Iredale (born 1992) was awarded first place and Best in Category in the 2009 Intel International Science and Engineering Fair for her earth and planetary science project. She attends the Sequim High School, Sequim, Washington, U.S.A || 
|-id=693
| 25693 Ishitani ||  || Catherine Elizabeth Ishitani (born 1992) was awarded second place in the 2009 Intel International Science and Engineering Fair for her medicine and health sciences project. She attends the Mayo High School, Rochester, Minnesota, U.S.A || 
|-id=695
| 25695 Eileenjang ||  || Eileen Kao Jang (born 1991) was awarded second place in the 2009 Intel International Science and Engineering Fair for her environmental science project. She attends the North Carolina School of Science and Mathematics, Durham, North Carolina, U.S.A || 
|-id=696
| 25696 Kylejones ||  || Kyle Jones (born 1990) was awarded second place in the 2009 Intel International Science and Engineering Fair for his cellular and molecular biology project. He attends the Villages High School, The Villages, Florida, U.S.A || 
|-id=697
| 25697 Kadiyala ||  || Vishnu Kiran Kadiyala (born 1992) was awarded second place in the 2009 Intel International Science and Engineering Fair for his medicine and health sciences team project. He attends the duPont Manual Magnet High School, Louisville, Kentucky, U.S.A || 
|-id=698
| 25698 Snehakannan ||  || Sneha Trichy Kannan (born 1992) was awarded second place in the 2009 Intel International Science and Engineering Fair for her medicine and health sciences project. She attends the Montgomery Blair High School, Silver Spring, Maryland, U.S.A || 
|}

25701–25800 

|-
| 25701 Alexkeeler ||  || Alex Keeler (born 1994) was awarded second place in the 2009 Intel International Science and Engineering Fair for his biochemistry team project. He attends the Villages High School, The Villages, Florida, U.S.A || 
|-id=704
| 25704 Kendrick ||  || Alexander Kent Kendrick (born 1993) was awarded first place and Best in Category in the 2009 Intel International Science and Engineering Fair for his electrical and mechanical engineering project. He attends the Los Alamos High School, Los Alamos, New Mexico, U.S.A || 
|-id=706
| 25706 Cekoscielski ||  || Caitlyn Elizabeth Koscielski (born 1991) was awarded second place in the 2009 Intel International Science and Engineering Fair for her chemistry team project. She attends the Marian High School, Mishawaka, Indiana, U.S.A || 
|-id=708
| 25708 Vedantkumar ||  || Vedant Subramaniam Kumar (born 1993) was awarded second place in the 2009 Intel International Science and Engineering Fair for his computer science project. He attends the duPont Manual Magnet High School, Louisville, Kentucky, U.S.A || 
|-id=710
| 25710 Petelandgren ||  || Peter Chal Landgren (born 1990) was awarded second place in the 2009 Intel International Science and Engineering Fair for his environmental management team project. He attends the Westview High School, Portland, Oregon, U.S.A || 
|-id=711
| 25711 Lebovits ||  || Elias Lebovits (born 1991) was awarded second place in the 2009 Intel International Science and Engineering Fair for his materials and bioengineering team project. He attends the Ramaz Upper School, New York, New York, U.S.A || 
|-id=714
| 25714 Aprillee ||  || April S. Lee (born 1991) was awarded second place in the 2009 Intel International Science and Engineering Fair for her plant sciences project. She attends the Stuyvesant High School, New York, New York, U.S.A || 
|-id=715
| 25715 Lizmariemako ||  || Elizabeth Marie Mako (born 1991) was awarded second place in the 2009 Intel International Science and Engineering Fair for her electrical and mechanical engineering project. She attends the W.T. Woodson High School, Fairfax, Virginia, U.S.A || 
|-id=717
| 25717 Ritikmal ||  || Ritik Malhotra (born 1992) was awarded second place in the 2009 Intel International Science and Engineering Fair for his electrical and mechanical engineering project. He attends the Lynbrook High School, San Jose, California, U.S.A || 
|-id=720
| 25720 Mallidi ||  || Sandeep Mallidi (born 1991) was awarded second place in the 2009 Intel International Science and Engineering Fair for his earth and planetary science team project. He attends the Westview High School, Portland, Oregon, U.S.A || 
|-id=721
| 25721 Anartya ||  || Anartya Mandal (born 1990) was awarded first place and Best in Category in the 2009 Intel International Science and Engineering Fair for his biochemistry project. He attends the Boston Latin School, Boston, Massachusetts, U.S.A || 
|-id=722
| 25722 Evanmarshall ||  || Evan George Marshall (born 1992) was awarded second place in the 2009 Intel International Science and Engineering Fair for his earth and planetary science team project. He attends the Westview High School, Portland, Oregon, U.S.A || 
|-id=723
| 25723 Shamascharak ||  || Shamik Mascharak (born 1993) was awarded second place in the 2009 Intel International Science and Engineering Fair for his chemistry project. He attends the Santa Cruz High School, Santa Cruz, California, U.S.A || 
|-id=725
| 25725 McCormick ||  || Lydia L McCormick (born 1992) was awarded first place in the 2009 Intel International Science and Engineering Fair for her animal sciences project. She attends the Jefferson County International Baccalaureate, Birmingham, Alabama, U.S.A || 
|-id=727
| 25727 Karsonmiller ||  || Karson M. Miller (born 1991) was awarded second place in the 2009 Intel International Science and Engineering Fair for his electrical and mechanical engineering project. He attends the John L. Miller-Great Neck North High School, Great Neck, New York, U.S.A || 
|-id=742
| 25742 Amandablanco ||  || Amanda Blanco (born 1933) is a photographer who has volunteered at Lowell since 2011. Her projects have included photographing Lowell children's summer camps and Observatory special events. Her current project is photographing flowers and trees on the Observatory campus to be used in future outdoor signage. || 
|-id=743
| 25743 Serrato ||  || Roger Serrato (born 1954) has volunteered at Lowell Observatory since 2012. He has recently been involved in special projects, among them creating a comprehensive file about the Discovery Channel Telescope and indexing/digitizing all of the Observatory's newsletters dating back to 1988. || 
|-id=744
| 25744 Surajmishra ||  || Suraj K. Mishra (born 1991) was awarded first place in the 2009 Intel International Science and Engineering Fair for his cellular and molecular biology project. He attends the Mills E. Godwin High School, Richmond, Virginia, U.S.A || 
|-id=745
| 25745 Schimmelpenninck ||  || Marie Schimmelpenninck (born 1952) has been a Lowell Observatory volunteer since 2002. She was a daytime tour guide and solar telescope operator for 13 years. She is presently working on identifying the Observatory's flowers and trees for future Lowell campus signage. || 
|-id=746
| 25746 Nickscoville ||  || Nicholas Z. Scoville (born 1945) is an astronomer at the California Institute of Technology. || 
|-id=747
| 25747 Nicerasmus ||  || Nicolas Erasmus (born 1985) is an instrument scientist at the South African Astronomical Observatory (Cape Town, South Africa). His early research was in experimental laser physics, and he transitioned into working on photometric observations of asteroids and astronomical instrumentation. || 
|-id=750
| 25750 Miwnay ||  || Miwnay was the name of a Sogdian abandoned wife from Samarkand. || 
|-id=751
| 25751 Mokshagundam ||  || Shilpa Mokshagundam (born 1992) was awarded second place in the 2009 Intel International Science and Engineering Fair for her medicine and health sciences team project. She attends the duPont Manual High School, Prospect, Kentucky, U.S.A || 
|-id=760
| 25760 Annaspitz ||  || Anna Spitz (born 1954) is Education and Public Outreach Lead for the NASA OSIRIS-REx asteroid sample return mission || 
|-id=763
| 25763 Naveenmurali ||  || Naveen Murali (born 1992) was awarded second place in the 2009 Intel International Science and Engineering Fair for his materials and bioengineering team project. He attends the Staples High School, Westport, Connecticut, U.S.A || 
|-id=764
| 25764 Divyanag ||  || Divya Nag (born 1991) was awarded second place in the 2009 Intel International Science and Engineering Fair for her earth and planetary science project. She attends the Mira Loma High School, Sacramento, California, U.S.A || 
|-id=765
| 25765 Heatherlynne ||  || Heather Lynne Nielsen (born 1992) was awarded second place in the 2009 Intel International Science and Engineering Fair for her biochemistry team project. She attends the Villages High School, The Villages, Florida, U.S.A || 
|-id=766
| 25766 Nosarzewski ||  || Benjamin Lee Nosarzewski (born 1991) was awarded second place in the 2009 Intel International Science and Engineering Fair for his physics project. He attends the Paul Laurence Dunbar High School, Lexington, Kentucky, U.S.A || 
|-id=767
| 25767 Stevennoyce ||  || Steven Gary Noyce (born 1991) was awarded second place in the 2009 Intel International Science and Engineering Fair for his materials and bioengineering project. He attended the American Fork High School, American Fork, Utah, U.S.A || 
|-id=768
| 25768 Nussbaum ||  || Trisha Paige Nussbaum (born 1991) was awarded second place in the 2009 Intel International Science and Engineering Fair for her behavioral and social sciences project. She attends the Roslyn High School, Roslyn Heights, New York, U.S.A || 
|-id=769
| 25769 Munaoli ||  || Muna Oli (born 1992) was awarded second place in the 2009 Intel International Science and Engineering Fair for her medicine and health sciences project. She attends the Eastside High School, Gainesville, Florida, U.S.A || 
|-id=772
| 25772 Ashpatra ||  || Ashutosh Patra (born 1991) was awarded first place in the 2009 Intel International Science and Engineering Fair for his energy and transportation team project. He attends the Sunset High School, Portland, Oregon, U.S.A || 
|-id=775
| 25775 Danielpeng ||  || Daniel Y. Peng (born 1991) was awarded second place in the 2009 Intel International Science and Engineering Fair for his materials and bioengineering team project. He attends the Monta Vista High School, Cupertino, California, U.S.A || 
|-id=778
| 25778 Csere ||  || Elemír Csere, 20th-century Slovak amateur astronomer, founder of the public observatory in Hlohovec and its first director || 
|-id=781
| 25781 Rajendra ||  || Ashoka Sanjaya Rajendra (born 1991) was awarded first place and Best in Category in the 2009 Intel International Science and Engineering Fair for his medicine and health sciences project. He attends the Loudoun County Academy of Science, Sterling, Virginia, U.S.A || 
|-id=783
| 25783 Brandontyler ||  || Brandon Tyler Ramirez (born 1991) was awarded second place in the 2009 Intel International Science and Engineering Fair for his physics team project. || 
|-id=793
| 25793 Chrisanchez ||  || Christopher Allen Sanchez (born 1992) was awarded second place in the 2009 Intel International Science and Engineering Fair for his plant sciences project. || 
|-id=798
| 25798 Reneeschaaf ||  || Renee Louise Schaaf (born 1991) was awarded second place in the 2009 Intel International Science and Engineering Fair for her energy and transportation project. || 
|-id=799
| 25799 Anmaschlegel ||  || Angela Marie Schlegel (born 1991) was awarded second place in the 2009 Intel International Science and Engineering Fair for her plant sciences project. || 
|-id=800
| 25800 Glukhovsky ||  || Lisa Doreen Glukhovsky (born 1986), a 2004 Talent finalist, was awarded first place and Best in Category in the 2003 Intel International Science and Engineering Fair for her earth and space sciences project. She is also Recipient of the Young Scientist Award. || 
|}

25801–25900 

|-
| 25801 Oliviaschwob ||  || Olivia Catherine Schwob (born 1992) was awarded first place in the 2009 Intel International Science and Engineering Fair for her behavioral and social sciences project. She also received the Intel Young Scientist Award. She attends the Boston Latin School, Boston, Massachusetts, U.S.A || 
|-id=807
| 25807 Baharshah ||  || Bahar Bipin Shah (born 1991) was awarded second place in the 2009 Intel International Science and Engineering Fair for her medicine and health sciences project. She attends the Canterbury School, Fort Myers, Florida, U.S.A || 
|-id=811
| 25811 Richardteo ||  || Richard Teo Keng Siang (1972–2012), a Singapore cosmetic surgeon. || 
|-id=813
| 25813 Savannahshaw ||  || Savannah Shaw (born 1992) was awarded second place in the 2009 Intel International Science and Engineering Fair for her biochemistry team project. She attends the Villages Charter High School, The Villages, Florida, U.S.A || 
|-id=814
| 25814 Preesinghal ||  || Preeti Singhal (born 1993) was awarded second place in the 2009 Intel International Science and Engineering Fair for her biochemistry project. She attends the Arlington High School, Arlington, Texas, U.S.A || 
|-id=815
| 25815 Scottskirlo ||  || Scott Alexander Skirlo (born 1990) was awarded first place and Best in Category in the 2009 Intel International Science and Engineering Fair for his materials and bioengineering project. He attends the Thomas Jefferson High School for Science and Technology, Alexandria, Virginia, U.S.A || 
|-id=817
| 25817 Tahilramani ||  || Mayank Tahilramani (born 1991) was awarded second place in the 2009 Intel International Science and Engineering Fair for his microbiology project. He attends the Peachtree Ridge High School, Suwanee, Georgia, U.S.A || 
|-id=819
| 25819 Tripathi ||  || Maanas Tripathi (born 1992) was awarded second place in the 2009 Intel International Science and Engineering Fair for his environmental management team project. He attends the Westview High School, Portland, Oregon, U.S.A || 
|-id=822
| 25822 Carolinejune ||  || Caroline June Trippel (born 1991) was awarded second place in the 2009 Intel International Science and Engineering Fair for her chemistry team project. She attends the Marian High School, Mishawaka, Indiana, U.S.A || 
|-id=823
| 25823 Dentrujillo ||  || Dennis Paul Trujillo (born 1992) was awarded second place in the 2009 Intel International Science and Engineering Fair for his physics team project. He attends the McCurdy High School, Espanola, New Mexico, U.S.A || 
|-id=824
| 25824 Viviantsang ||  || Vivian Connie Tsang (born 1991) was awarded second place in the 2009 Intel International Science and Engineering Fair for her environmental management project. She attends the Sunset High School, Portland, Oregon, U.S.A || 
|-id=832
| 25832 Van Scoyoc ||  || Amy Elizabeth Van Scoyoc (born 1991) was awarded second place in the 2009 Intel International Science and Engineering Fair for her environmental science project. She attends the East Hampton High School, East Hampton, New York, U.S.A || 
|-id=834
| 25834 Vechinski ||  || Ashley Kate Vechinski (born 1994) was awarded second place in the 2009 Intel International Science and Engineering Fair for her computer science team project. She attends the Life Christian Academy, Harvest, Alabama, U.S.A || 
|-id=835
| 25835 Tomzega ||  || Tom Zega (born 1973), a scientist at the University of Arizona's Lunar and Planetary Laboratory. || 
|-id=836
| 25836 Harishvemuri ||  || Harish Srikar Vemuri (born 1991) was awarded second place in the 2009 Intel International Science and Engineering Fair for his environmental management team project. He attends the Westview High School, Portland, Oregon, U.S.A || 
|-id=851
| 25851 Browning ||  || Joyce R. Browning, (1943–2019) was a long time member of Lowell Observatory's Advisory Board. She volunteered her time and talent helping Lowell Observatory during special events, including the 2017 solar eclipse. Joyce was dedicated to volunteering and sharing her knowledge. || 
|-id=858
| 25858 Donherbert ||  || Don Herbert (a.k.a. "Mr. Wizard", 1917–2007) was the creator and host of Watch Mr. Wizard and Mr. Wizard's World, programs that brought science to millions of children from 1950 to 1990 and that inspired generations of budding scientists. || 
|-id=864
| 25864 Banič ||  || Štefan Banič, 19th–20th-century Slovak-American inventor of the parachute || 
|-id=867
| 25867 DeMuth ||  || Mary DeMuth (born 1954) has worked at Lowell Observatory since 2001, starting as the Observatory's front office receptionist, then in Public Programs as an educator, then in scheduling and now as Volunteer Coordinator. || 
|-id=869
| 25869 Jacoby ||  || George Jacoby (born 1948) is currently Deputy Director for Technology at Lowell Observatory, responsible for the oversight of Lowell's observing facilities as well as the instrument, engineering, and IT groups. Previously he was director of WIYN and program head of the NOAO Office of Science. || 
|-id=870
| 25870 Panchovigil ||  || Francisco ("Pancho") Martin Vigil (born 1990) was awarded second place in the 2009 Intel International Science and Engineering Fair for his physics team project. He attends the McCurdy High School, Espanola, New Mexico, U.S.A || 
|-id=875
| 25875 Wickramasekara ||  || Sajith M. Wickramasekara (born 1991) was awarded second place in the 2009 Intel International Science and Engineering Fair for his medicine and health sciences team project. He attends the North Carolina School of Science and Mathematics, Durham, North Carolina, U.S.A || 
|-id=877
| 25877 Katherinexue ||  || Katherine Shaohua Xue (born 1991) was awarded second place in the 2009 Intel International Science and Engineering Fair for her microbiology team project. She attends the Oak Ridge High School, Oak Ridge, Tennessee, U.S.A || 
|-id=878
| 25878 Sihengyou ||  || Siheng S. You (born 1991) was awarded first place in the 2009 Intel International Science and Engineering Fair for his energy and transportation team project. He attends the Sunset High School, Portland, Oregon, U.S.A || 
|-id=884
| 25884 Asai ||  || Yoshihiko Asai (born 1957), a professor at Higashi Nippon International University. || 
|-id=885
| 25885 Wiesinger ||  || Christoph Wiesinger (born 1989) was awarded second place in the 2009 Intel International Science and Engineering Fair for his materials and bioengineering project. He attends the HTL Braunau School, Braunau am Inn, Austria || 
|-id=890
| 25890 Louisburg ||  || Louisburg, Kansas, home of the Powell Observatory || 
|-id=892
| 25892 Funabashi ||  || The Japanese city of Funabashi located near Tokyo. There is good fishing offshore, and during the Edo era fish caught there were donated to the Shogun. Sports are popular in the city now, and it is the home town of several sports teams. || 
|-id=893
| 25893 Sugihara ||  || Chiune Sugihara, Japanese diplomat in Lithuania, who defied orders and assisted asylum-seekers fleeing Nazi persecution in Europe during World War II † || 
|-id=898
| 25898 Alpoge ||  || Levent Alpoge (born 1992) is a finalist in the 2010 Intel Science Talent Search (STS), a science competition for high school seniors, for his computer science project. He attends the Half Hollow Hills High School West, Dix Hills, New York || 
|-id=899
| 25899 Namratanand ||  || Namrata Anand (born 1992) is a finalist in the 2010 Intel Science Talent Search (STS), a science competition for high school seniors, for her physics project. She attends the Harker School, San Jose, California || 
|}

25901–26000 

|-
| 25901 Ericbrooks ||  || Eric David Brooks (born 1993) is a finalist in the 2010 Intel Science Talent Search (STS), a science competition for high school seniors, for his bioinformatics and genomics project. He attends the George W. Hewlett High School, Hewlett, New York || 
|-id=903
| 25903 Yuvalcalev ||  || Yuval Yaacov Calev (born 1992) is a finalist in the 2010 Intel Science Talent Search (STS), a science competition for high school seniors, for his behavioral and social sciences project. He attends the Ward Melville High School, East Setauket, New York || 
|-id=905
| 25905 Clerico ||  || Domenico Clerico (1950–2017), from the Langhe region of Piemonte, was a world-famous Italian winemaker. Name suggested by E. Bowell, A. W. Harris (JPL) and V. Zappalà. || 
|-id=906
| 25906 Morrell ||  || Nidia I. Morrell (born 1953) is an astronomer at Las Campanas Observatory known for her work on O-type and Wolf-Rayet stars as well as massive binaries. As a member of the Carnegie Supernova Project, she also studies the spectacular explosions these stars make at the end of their lives. || 
|-id=907
| 25907 Capodilupo ||  || John Vincenzo Capodilupo (born 1991) is a finalist in the 2010 Intel Science Talent Search (STS), a science competition for high school seniors, for his physics project. He attends the Catholic Central High School, Grand Rapids, Michigan || 
|-id=912
| 25912 Recawkwell ||  || Rachel Elizabeth Cawkwell (born 1992) is a finalist in the 2010 Intel Science Talent Search (STS), a science competition for high school seniors, for her medicine and health sciences project. She attends the Byram Hills High School, Armonk, New York || 
|-id=913
| 25913 Jamesgreen ||  || James L. Green (born 1951) is an American space physicist who has published widely on the Earth's and Jupiter's magnetospheres, as well as data systems and networks. As director of NASA's Planetary Science Division, he has overseen missions that explored Pluto, Mercury, Jupiter, Mars, the Moon and asteroids. || 
|-id=914
| 25914 Bair ||  || Allison Bair (born 1977) works at Lowell Observatory as a research assistant performing studies of the chemical composition and physical properties of comets. || 
|-id=915
| 25915 Charlesmcguire ||  || Charles J. McGuire (born 1932) is a retired aerospace engineer from the Mercury, Gemini and Apollo era, and is the grandfather of planetary scientist Elisabeth R. Adams. || 
|-id=919
| 25919 Comuniello ||  || Michael John Comuniello (born 1992) is a finalist in the 2010 Intel Science Talent Search (STS), a science competition for high school seniors, for his behavioral and social sciences project. He attends the Division Avenue High School, Levittown, New York || 
|-id=920
| 25920 Templeanne ||  || Temple Anne Douglas (born 1991) is a finalist in the 2010 Intel Science Talent Search (STS), a science competition for high school seniors, for her medicine and health sciences project. She attends the Thomas Jefferson High School for Science & Technology, Alexandria, Virginia || 
|-id=924
| 25924 Douglasadams ||  || Douglas Adams, 20th-century British author; the provisional designation for this asteroid references the year of his death, his initials, and the Answer to the Ultimate Question of Life, the Universe, and Everything (42), as given in his novel serial The Hitchhiker's Guide to the Galaxy || 
|-id=925
| 25925 Jamesfenska ||  || James Evan Fenska (born 1992) is a finalist in the 2010 Intel Science Talent Search (STS), a science competition for high school seniors, for his microbiology project. He attends the Miami High School, Miami, Oklahoma || 
|-id=927
| 25927 Jagandelman ||  || Jason A. Gandelman (born 1992) is a finalist in the 2010 Intel Science Talent Search (STS), a science competition for high school seniors, for his biochemistry project. He attends the Staples High School, Westport, Connecticut || 
|-id=930
| 25930 Spielberg ||  || Steven Spielberg (born 1946), an American film director || 
|-id=931
| 25931 Peterhu ||  || Peter Danming Hu (born 1991) is a finalist in the 2010 Intel Science Talent Search (STS), a science competition for high school seniors, for his materials science project. He attends the Texas Academy of Mathematics & Science, Denton, Texas || 
|-id=933
| 25933 Ruoyijiang ||  || Ruoyi Jiang (born 1992) is a finalist in the 2010 Intel Science Talent Search (STS), a science competition for high school seniors, for his biochemistry project. He attends the Ward Melville High School, East Setauket, New York || 
|-id=937
| 25937 Malysz ||  || Adam Małysz (born 1977) is a Polish ski jumper who won several medals at the Winter Olympic Games in 2002 and 2010. He is also a four-time winner of the World Ski Championship and the World Cup. || 
|-id=938
| 25938 Stoch ||  || Kamil Stoch (born 1987), is a Polish ski jumper, who won three gold medals at the Winter Olympic Games in 2014 and 2018, and who won the Four Hills Tournament (Vierschanzentournee) several times as well as the World Ski Championship in 2013, 2017 and 2019. || 
|-id=940
| 25940 Mikeschottland ||  || Michael R. Schottland (1889–1962), was an American industrialist and founder of the Virginia Mirror Company. As a philanthropist and amateur astronomer, he donated the original astrograph for the LONEOS telescope, with which a large number of minor planets were discovered. || 
|-id=941
| 25941 Susanahearn ||  || Susan Ahearn (born 1949) first visited Lowell Observatory as a child, with her family, on vacation. She became enthralled with the dark night skies of Arizona at that time and has supported astronomy research and education with her husband, Bill, for twenty-six years. || 
|-id=942
| 25942 Walborn ||  || Nolan R. Walborn (born 1945) is a stellar spectroscopist specializing in the optical and ultraviolet morphology of hot, massive stars, such as O and B, Wolf-Rayet, and Luminous Blue Variables. His studies have included star forming regions in the Milky Way and the Magellanic Clouds. || 
|-id=943
| 25943 Billahearn ||  || William "Bill" Ahearn (born 1946) first visited Lowell Observatory as a teenager. He has been a supporter of astronomy and astronomy education ever since. He and his wife, Susan, have supported Lowell Observatory's research and education for twenty-six years. || 
|-id=944
| 25944 Charlesross ||  || Charles "Charlie" Ross (born 1934) is a long-time admirer of astronomy and STEM education at Lowell Observatory. He and his wife, Pam, have been engaged with the observatory for over 25 years. || 
|-id=945
| 25945 Moreadalleore ||  || Cristina Morea Dalle Ore (born 1958) is an Italian-American astronomer, who has published papers on stellar atmospheres and planetary science. As a team associate on NASA's New Horizons mission to Pluto and the Kuiper Belt, she developed complex techniques for the spectral analysis of planetary surfaces. || 
|-id=951
| 25951 Pamross ||  || Pam Ross (born 1949) is a long time supporter of Lowell Observatory. She has served on the Lowell Observatory Advisory Board for over 25 years. || 
|-id=953
| 25953 Lanairlett ||  || Lanair Amaad Lett (born 1991) is a finalist in the 2010 Intel Science Talent Search (STS), a science competition for high school seniors, for his medicine and health sciences project. He attends the North Carolina School of Science & Mathematics, Durham, North Carolina || 
|-id=954
| 25954 Trantow ||  || Donald "Don" Trantow (born 1942) is a long-time supporter of Lowell Observatory, currently serving on the Lowell Advisory Board. He operates a private observatory on Bainbridge Island, Washington. Don shares his love of astronomy with friends, neighbors, school groups and amateur astronomy clubs. || 
|-id=955
| 25955 Radway ||  || John Radway (born 1936) is a long-time supporter of Lowell Observatory, currently serving on the Advisory Board and the Lowell Observatory Foundation Board. In retirement, John has focused on learning about astronomy and physics. He writes and distributes philosophical essays about the cosmos. || 
|-id=956
| 25956 Spanierbeckage ||  || Bridget Spanier-Beckage (born 1950) is a long-time supporter of Lowell Observatory. As a former teacher, Bridget encourages Lowell's STEM education programs for children. || 
|-id=957
| 25957 Davidconnell ||  || W. David Connell (born 1954) is an avid supporter of dark skies in Northern Arizona. He is a long-time member of the Lowell Observatory Advisory Board. In 2014, he assisted in the creation of the Lowell Observatory Foundation and has served as chair of the Foundation board since its founding. || 
|-id=958
| 25958 Battams ||  || Karl Battams (born 1979) is an astrophysicist and computational scientist at the U.S. Naval Research Laboratory in Washington, D.C. He has been in charge of the Sungrazer Project since 2003, overseeing most of the project's 3400+ sungrazing comet discoveries, and has contributed to the study of numerous near-Sun comets. || 
|-id=959
| 25959 Gingergiovale ||  || Virginia "Ginger" Gore Giovale (born 1943) is a long-time supporter of math and science education. She and her husband, John, have been engaged with astronomy research and education since 1988. She serves as a trustee of the Lowell Observatory Foundation. || 
|-id=960
| 25960 Timheckman ||  || Timothy Martin Heckman (born 1951), an astrophysicist at Johns Hopkins University, is a highly cited researcher who has concentrated on the evolution of galaxies and supermassive black holes. A multi-wavelength observer, he was involved in development of the Sloan Digital Sky Survey and the Galaxy Evolution Explorer. || 
|-id=961
| 25961 Conti ||  || Peter S. Conti (born 1934) is an astronomer known for his studies of hot luminous stars and the evolutionary connection between them. Specifically, he has studied O-type, Wolf-Rayet and Luminous Blue Variables. || 
|-id=962
| 25962 Yifanli ||  || Yifan Li (born 1991) is a finalist in the 2010 Intel Science Talent Sear ch (STS), a science competition for high school seniors, for his medicine and health sciences project. He attends the Montgomery Blair High School, Silver Spring, Maryland || 
|-id=963
| 25963 Elisalin ||  || Elisa Bisi Lin (born 1992) is a finalist in the 2010 Intel Science Talent Search (STS), a science competition for high school seniors, for her environmental science project. She attends the Plano West Senior High School, Plano, Texas || 
|-id=964
| 25964 Liudavid ||  || David Chienyun Liu (born 1992) is a finalist in the 2010 Intel Science Talent Search (STS), a science competition for high school seniors, for his computer science project. He attends the Lynbrook High School, San Jose, California || 
|-id=965
| 25965 Masihdas ||  || Paul Masih Das (born 1992) is a finalist in the 2010 Intel Science Talent Search (STS), a science competition for high school seniors, for his chemistry project. He attends the Lawrence High School, Cedarhurst, New York || 
|-id=966
| 25966 Akhilmathew ||  || Akhil Mathew (born 1992) is a finalist in the 2010 Intel Science Talent Search (STS), a science competition for high school seniors, for his mathematical sciences project. He attends the Madison High School, Madison, New Jersey || 
|-id=970
| 25970 Nelakanti ||  || Raman Venkat Nelakanti (born 1992) is a finalist in the 2010 Intel Science Talent Search (STS), a science competition for high school seniors, for his plant sciences project. He attends the Lynbrook High School, San Jose, California || 
|-id=972
| 25972 Pfefferjosh ||  || Joshua William Pfeffer (born 1992) is a finalist in the 2010 Intel Science Talent Search (STS), a science competition for high school seniors, for his mathematical sciences project. He attends the North Shore Hebrew Academy High School, Great Neck, New York || 
|-id=973
| 25973 Puranik ||  || Arjun Ranganath Puranik (born 1992) is a finalist in the 2010 Intel Science Talent Search (STS), a science competition for high school seniors, for his mathematical sciences project. He attends the William Fremd High School, Palatine, Illinois || 
|-id=978
| 25978 Katerudolph ||  || Katherine Rebecca Rudolph (born 1991) is a finalist in the 2010 Intel Science Talent Search (STS), a science competition for high school seniors, for her mathematical sciences project. She attends the Naperville Central High School, Naperville, Illinois || 
|-id=979
| 25979 Alansage ||  || Alan Robert Sage (born 1992) is a finalist in the 2010 Intel Science Talent Search (STS), a science competition for high school seniors, for his plant sciences project. He attends the Stuyvesant High School, New York, New York || 
|-id=981
| 25981 Shahmirian ||  || Sarine Gayaneh Shahmirian (born 1992) is a finalist in the 2010 Intel Science Talent Search (STS), a science competition for high school seniors, for her chemistry project. She attends the Chaminade College Preparatory, West Hills, California || 
|-id=986
| 25986 Sunanda ||  || Sunanda Sharma (born 1992) is a finalist in the 2010 Intel Science Talent Search (STS), a science competition for high school seniors, for her behavioral and social sciences project. She attends the Shrewsbury High School, Shrewsbury, Massachusetts || 
|-id=987
| 25987 Katherynshi ||  || Katheryn Cheng Shi (born 1993) is a finalist in the 2010 Intel Science Talent Search (STS), a science competition for high school seniors, for her chemistry project. She attends the Texas Academy of Mathematics & Science, Denton, Texas || 
|-id=988
| 25988 Janesuh ||  || Jane Yoonhae Suh (born 1991) is a finalist in the 2010 Intel Science Talent Search (STS), a science competition for high school seniors, for her medicine and health sciences project. She attends the Palos Verdes Peninsula High School, Rolling Hills Estates, California || 
|-id=992
| 25992 Benjamensun ||  || Benjamen Chang Sun (born 1992) is a finalist in the 2010 Intel Science Talent Search (STS), a science competition for high school seniors, for his environmental science project. He attends the Red River High School, Grand Forks, North Dakota || 
|-id=993
| 25993 Kevinxu ||  || Kevin Young Xu (born 1992) is a finalist in the 2010 Intel Science Talent Search (STS), a science competition for high school seniors, for his behavioral and social sciences project. He attends the Roslyn High School, Roslyn Heights, New York || 
|-id=994
| 25994 Lynnelleye ||  || Lynnelle Lin Ye (born 1992) is a finalist in the 2010 Intel Science Talent Search (STS), a science competition for high school seniors, for her mathematical sciences project. She attends the Palo Alto Senior High School, Palo Alto, California || 
|}

References 

025001-026000